

423001–423100 

|-bgcolor=#E9E9E9
| 423001 ||  || — || September 26, 2003 || Socorro || LINEAR || — || align=right | 2.2 km || 
|-id=002 bgcolor=#fefefe
| 423002 ||  || — || September 20, 2003 || Socorro || LINEAR || — || align=right | 1.3 km || 
|-id=003 bgcolor=#d6d6d6
| 423003 ||  || — || September 27, 2003 || Kitt Peak || Spacewatch || — || align=right | 2.8 km || 
|-id=004 bgcolor=#fefefe
| 423004 ||  || — || September 28, 2003 || Kitt Peak || Spacewatch || — || align=right | 1.0 km || 
|-id=005 bgcolor=#fefefe
| 423005 ||  || — || September 28, 2003 || Socorro || LINEAR || (2076) || align=right data-sort-value="0.97" | 970 m || 
|-id=006 bgcolor=#d6d6d6
| 423006 ||  || — || September 30, 2003 || Kitt Peak || Spacewatch || — || align=right | 2.5 km || 
|-id=007 bgcolor=#d6d6d6
| 423007 ||  || — || September 19, 2003 || Kitt Peak || Spacewatch || — || align=right | 1.9 km || 
|-id=008 bgcolor=#fefefe
| 423008 ||  || — || September 17, 2003 || Palomar || NEAT || — || align=right data-sort-value="0.65" | 650 m || 
|-id=009 bgcolor=#fefefe
| 423009 ||  || — || September 18, 2003 || Socorro || LINEAR || NYS || align=right data-sort-value="0.57" | 570 m || 
|-id=010 bgcolor=#d6d6d6
| 423010 ||  || — || September 26, 2003 || Apache Point || SDSS || — || align=right | 2.3 km || 
|-id=011 bgcolor=#fefefe
| 423011 ||  || — || September 18, 2003 || Anderson Mesa || LONEOS || — || align=right data-sort-value="0.75" | 750 m || 
|-id=012 bgcolor=#fefefe
| 423012 ||  || — || September 26, 2003 || Apache Point || SDSS || — || align=right data-sort-value="0.60" | 600 m || 
|-id=013 bgcolor=#fefefe
| 423013 ||  || — || September 26, 2003 || Apache Point || SDSS || — || align=right data-sort-value="0.59" | 590 m || 
|-id=014 bgcolor=#fefefe
| 423014 ||  || — || September 26, 2003 || Apache Point || SDSS || — || align=right data-sort-value="0.72" | 720 m || 
|-id=015 bgcolor=#fefefe
| 423015 ||  || — || September 27, 2003 || Kitt Peak || Spacewatch || — || align=right data-sort-value="0.72" | 720 m || 
|-id=016 bgcolor=#fefefe
| 423016 ||  || — || September 27, 2003 || Apache Point || SDSS || V || align=right data-sort-value="0.65" | 650 m || 
|-id=017 bgcolor=#d6d6d6
| 423017 ||  || — || September 27, 2003 || Apache Point || SDSS || — || align=right | 2.9 km || 
|-id=018 bgcolor=#d6d6d6
| 423018 ||  || — || September 28, 2003 || Apache Point || SDSS || KOR || align=right | 1.2 km || 
|-id=019 bgcolor=#fefefe
| 423019 ||  || — || September 29, 2003 || Kitt Peak || Spacewatch || — || align=right data-sort-value="0.76" | 760 m || 
|-id=020 bgcolor=#d6d6d6
| 423020 ||  || — || September 26, 2003 || Apache Point || SDSS || — || align=right | 2.5 km || 
|-id=021 bgcolor=#fefefe
| 423021 ||  || — || September 17, 2003 || Kitt Peak || Spacewatch || — || align=right data-sort-value="0.72" | 720 m || 
|-id=022 bgcolor=#FFC2E0
| 423022 ||  || — || October 6, 2003 || Socorro || LINEAR || APO || align=right data-sort-value="0.59" | 590 m || 
|-id=023 bgcolor=#d6d6d6
| 423023 ||  || — || October 1, 2003 || Anderson Mesa || LONEOS || — || align=right | 3.1 km || 
|-id=024 bgcolor=#fefefe
| 423024 ||  || — || October 14, 2003 || Anderson Mesa || LONEOS || H || align=right data-sort-value="0.90" | 900 m || 
|-id=025 bgcolor=#fefefe
| 423025 ||  || — || October 15, 2003 || Anderson Mesa || LONEOS || — || align=right | 1.3 km || 
|-id=026 bgcolor=#fefefe
| 423026 ||  || — || September 21, 2003 || Kitt Peak || Spacewatch || — || align=right data-sort-value="0.71" | 710 m || 
|-id=027 bgcolor=#d6d6d6
| 423027 ||  || — || October 5, 2003 || Kitt Peak || Spacewatch || — || align=right | 2.2 km || 
|-id=028 bgcolor=#E9E9E9
| 423028 ||  || — || October 16, 2003 || Kitt Peak || Spacewatch || — || align=right | 2.5 km || 
|-id=029 bgcolor=#d6d6d6
| 423029 ||  || — || October 16, 2003 || Palomar || NEAT || — || align=right | 2.1 km || 
|-id=030 bgcolor=#fefefe
| 423030 ||  || — || October 16, 2003 || Anderson Mesa || LONEOS || H || align=right data-sort-value="0.98" | 980 m || 
|-id=031 bgcolor=#fefefe
| 423031 ||  || — || October 20, 2003 || Socorro || LINEAR || — || align=right | 1.5 km || 
|-id=032 bgcolor=#fefefe
| 423032 ||  || — || October 18, 2003 || Palomar || NEAT || — || align=right data-sort-value="0.91" | 910 m || 
|-id=033 bgcolor=#fefefe
| 423033 ||  || — || October 17, 2003 || Anderson Mesa || LONEOS || — || align=right data-sort-value="0.79" | 790 m || 
|-id=034 bgcolor=#fefefe
| 423034 ||  || — || October 16, 2003 || Palomar || NEAT || — || align=right | 1.3 km || 
|-id=035 bgcolor=#E9E9E9
| 423035 ||  || — || September 21, 2003 || Kitt Peak || Spacewatch || — || align=right | 1.7 km || 
|-id=036 bgcolor=#d6d6d6
| 423036 ||  || — || October 19, 2003 || Kitt Peak || Spacewatch || EOS || align=right | 1.6 km || 
|-id=037 bgcolor=#d6d6d6
| 423037 ||  || — || October 16, 2003 || Campo Imperatore || CINEOS || — || align=right | 3.5 km || 
|-id=038 bgcolor=#fefefe
| 423038 ||  || — || October 1, 2003 || Kitt Peak || Spacewatch || — || align=right data-sort-value="0.90" | 900 m || 
|-id=039 bgcolor=#fefefe
| 423039 ||  || — || October 20, 2003 || Socorro || LINEAR || — || align=right data-sort-value="0.73" | 730 m || 
|-id=040 bgcolor=#fefefe
| 423040 ||  || — || October 20, 2003 || Kitt Peak || Spacewatch || — || align=right data-sort-value="0.77" | 770 m || 
|-id=041 bgcolor=#fefefe
| 423041 ||  || — || October 20, 2003 || Kitt Peak || Spacewatch || — || align=right | 1.1 km || 
|-id=042 bgcolor=#fefefe
| 423042 ||  || — || October 18, 2003 || Kitt Peak || Spacewatch || — || align=right data-sort-value="0.68" | 680 m || 
|-id=043 bgcolor=#d6d6d6
| 423043 ||  || — || October 18, 2003 || Kitt Peak || Spacewatch || EOS || align=right | 1.8 km || 
|-id=044 bgcolor=#fefefe
| 423044 ||  || — || October 21, 2003 || Socorro || LINEAR || — || align=right data-sort-value="0.96" | 960 m || 
|-id=045 bgcolor=#fefefe
| 423045 ||  || — || October 21, 2003 || Anderson Mesa || LONEOS || — || align=right data-sort-value="0.64" | 640 m || 
|-id=046 bgcolor=#fefefe
| 423046 ||  || — || October 21, 2003 || Palomar || NEAT || — || align=right | 1.6 km || 
|-id=047 bgcolor=#fefefe
| 423047 ||  || — || October 22, 2003 || Socorro || LINEAR || — || align=right data-sort-value="0.98" | 980 m || 
|-id=048 bgcolor=#d6d6d6
| 423048 ||  || — || October 1, 2003 || Kitt Peak || Spacewatch || EOS || align=right | 1.7 km || 
|-id=049 bgcolor=#fefefe
| 423049 ||  || — || October 21, 2003 || Kitt Peak || Spacewatch || — || align=right data-sort-value="0.58" | 580 m || 
|-id=050 bgcolor=#fefefe
| 423050 ||  || — || October 23, 2003 || Kitt Peak || Spacewatch || — || align=right data-sort-value="0.82" | 820 m || 
|-id=051 bgcolor=#fefefe
| 423051 ||  || — || October 28, 2003 || Socorro || LINEAR || — || align=right data-sort-value="0.84" | 840 m || 
|-id=052 bgcolor=#fefefe
| 423052 ||  || — || October 28, 2003 || Socorro || LINEAR || — || align=right data-sort-value="0.85" | 850 m || 
|-id=053 bgcolor=#fefefe
| 423053 ||  || — || October 16, 2003 || Kitt Peak || Spacewatch || — || align=right | 1.3 km || 
|-id=054 bgcolor=#fefefe
| 423054 ||  || — || October 24, 2003 || Socorro || LINEAR || — || align=right data-sort-value="0.83" | 830 m || 
|-id=055 bgcolor=#d6d6d6
| 423055 ||  || — || October 23, 2003 || Apache Point || SDSS || KOR || align=right | 1.3 km || 
|-id=056 bgcolor=#d6d6d6
| 423056 ||  || — || October 17, 2003 || Apache Point || SDSS || — || align=right | 2.1 km || 
|-id=057 bgcolor=#fefefe
| 423057 ||  || — || October 3, 2003 || Kitt Peak || Spacewatch || — || align=right data-sort-value="0.57" | 570 m || 
|-id=058 bgcolor=#E9E9E9
| 423058 ||  || — || October 19, 2003 || Apache Point || SDSS || — || align=right | 2.2 km || 
|-id=059 bgcolor=#fefefe
| 423059 ||  || — || October 24, 2003 || Socorro || LINEAR || — || align=right data-sort-value="0.82" | 820 m || 
|-id=060 bgcolor=#d6d6d6
| 423060 ||  || — || November 19, 2003 || Socorro || LINEAR || — || align=right | 4.5 km || 
|-id=061 bgcolor=#d6d6d6
| 423061 ||  || — || November 18, 2003 || Palomar || NEAT || — || align=right | 2.5 km || 
|-id=062 bgcolor=#d6d6d6
| 423062 ||  || — || November 19, 2003 || Kitt Peak || Spacewatch || — || align=right | 3.6 km || 
|-id=063 bgcolor=#fefefe
| 423063 ||  || — || November 20, 2003 || Socorro || LINEAR || — || align=right data-sort-value="0.94" | 940 m || 
|-id=064 bgcolor=#fefefe
| 423064 ||  || — || November 21, 2003 || Socorro || LINEAR || — || align=right data-sort-value="0.83" | 830 m || 
|-id=065 bgcolor=#fefefe
| 423065 ||  || — || November 19, 2003 || Anderson Mesa || LONEOS || — || align=right data-sort-value="0.71" | 710 m || 
|-id=066 bgcolor=#fefefe
| 423066 ||  || — || November 21, 2003 || Socorro || LINEAR || H || align=right data-sort-value="0.87" | 870 m || 
|-id=067 bgcolor=#fefefe
| 423067 ||  || — || November 20, 2003 || Socorro || LINEAR || — || align=right | 1.5 km || 
|-id=068 bgcolor=#fefefe
| 423068 ||  || — || November 21, 2003 || Socorro || LINEAR || ERI || align=right | 1.7 km || 
|-id=069 bgcolor=#fefefe
| 423069 ||  || — || November 26, 2003 || Kitt Peak || Spacewatch || (2076) || align=right data-sort-value="0.90" | 900 m || 
|-id=070 bgcolor=#E9E9E9
| 423070 ||  || — || October 25, 2003 || Socorro || LINEAR || — || align=right | 2.7 km || 
|-id=071 bgcolor=#fefefe
| 423071 ||  || — || November 18, 2003 || Catalina || CSS || — || align=right | 1.8 km || 
|-id=072 bgcolor=#d6d6d6
| 423072 ||  || — || November 21, 2003 || Socorro || LINEAR || — || align=right | 3.3 km || 
|-id=073 bgcolor=#d6d6d6
| 423073 ||  || — || November 19, 2003 || Kitt Peak || Spacewatch || — || align=right | 2.9 km || 
|-id=074 bgcolor=#fefefe
| 423074 ||  || — || November 26, 2003 || Kitt Peak || Spacewatch || MAS || align=right data-sort-value="0.54" | 540 m || 
|-id=075 bgcolor=#fefefe
| 423075 ||  || — || November 16, 2003 || Kitt Peak || Spacewatch || — || align=right data-sort-value="0.63" | 630 m || 
|-id=076 bgcolor=#fefefe
| 423076 ||  || — || December 14, 2003 || Palomar || NEAT || H || align=right data-sort-value="0.87" | 870 m || 
|-id=077 bgcolor=#d6d6d6
| 423077 ||  || — || December 15, 2003 || Needville || Needville Obs. || — || align=right | 4.8 km || 
|-id=078 bgcolor=#d6d6d6
| 423078 ||  || — || December 1, 2003 || Kitt Peak || Spacewatch || — || align=right | 2.8 km || 
|-id=079 bgcolor=#d6d6d6
| 423079 ||  || — || December 1, 2003 || Socorro || LINEAR || EOS || align=right | 2.1 km || 
|-id=080 bgcolor=#d6d6d6
| 423080 ||  || — || December 1, 2003 || Kitt Peak || Spacewatch || — || align=right | 3.0 km || 
|-id=081 bgcolor=#d6d6d6
| 423081 ||  || — || December 1, 2003 || Kitt Peak || Spacewatch || — || align=right | 2.3 km || 
|-id=082 bgcolor=#fefefe
| 423082 ||  || — || December 17, 2003 || Socorro || LINEAR || H || align=right | 1.0 km || 
|-id=083 bgcolor=#fefefe
| 423083 ||  || — || December 18, 2003 || Socorro || LINEAR || NYS || align=right data-sort-value="0.65" | 650 m || 
|-id=084 bgcolor=#fefefe
| 423084 ||  || — || December 17, 2003 || Kitt Peak || Spacewatch || — || align=right data-sort-value="0.68" | 680 m || 
|-id=085 bgcolor=#fefefe
| 423085 ||  || — || December 19, 2003 || Kitt Peak || Spacewatch || NYS || align=right data-sort-value="0.53" | 530 m || 
|-id=086 bgcolor=#fefefe
| 423086 ||  || — || December 20, 2003 || Socorro || LINEAR || — || align=right | 1.0 km || 
|-id=087 bgcolor=#fefefe
| 423087 ||  || — || December 18, 2003 || Socorro || LINEAR || — || align=right data-sort-value="0.75" | 750 m || 
|-id=088 bgcolor=#d6d6d6
| 423088 ||  || — || December 19, 2003 || Socorro || LINEAR || — || align=right | 4.0 km || 
|-id=089 bgcolor=#d6d6d6
| 423089 ||  || — || December 19, 2003 || Kitt Peak || Spacewatch || — || align=right | 2.2 km || 
|-id=090 bgcolor=#d6d6d6
| 423090 ||  || — || December 21, 2003 || Kitt Peak || Spacewatch || — || align=right | 4.4 km || 
|-id=091 bgcolor=#fefefe
| 423091 ||  || — || December 23, 2003 || Socorro || LINEAR || — || align=right data-sort-value="0.84" | 840 m || 
|-id=092 bgcolor=#d6d6d6
| 423092 ||  || — || December 23, 2003 || Socorro || LINEAR || — || align=right | 5.2 km || 
|-id=093 bgcolor=#d6d6d6
| 423093 ||  || — || December 27, 2003 || Socorro || LINEAR || — || align=right | 3.2 km || 
|-id=094 bgcolor=#d6d6d6
| 423094 ||  || — || December 27, 2003 || Socorro || LINEAR || — || align=right | 3.8 km || 
|-id=095 bgcolor=#d6d6d6
| 423095 ||  || — || December 28, 2003 || Socorro || LINEAR || — || align=right | 3.2 km || 
|-id=096 bgcolor=#fefefe
| 423096 ||  || — || December 17, 2003 || Socorro || LINEAR || — || align=right data-sort-value="0.98" | 980 m || 
|-id=097 bgcolor=#fefefe
| 423097 Richardjarrell ||  ||  || December 16, 2003 || Mauna Kea || D. D. Balam || — || align=right data-sort-value="0.71" | 710 m || 
|-id=098 bgcolor=#fefefe
| 423098 ||  || — || December 28, 2003 || Socorro || LINEAR || H || align=right data-sort-value="0.74" | 740 m || 
|-id=099 bgcolor=#C2FFFF
| 423099 ||  || — || January 15, 2004 || Kitt Peak || Spacewatch || L5 || align=right | 13 km || 
|-id=100 bgcolor=#FFC2E0
| 423100 ||  || — || January 17, 2004 || Palomar || NEAT || APO || align=right data-sort-value="0.78" | 780 m || 
|}

423101–423200 

|-bgcolor=#fefefe
| 423101 ||  || — || January 16, 2004 || Palomar || NEAT || — || align=right data-sort-value="0.81" | 810 m || 
|-id=102 bgcolor=#fefefe
| 423102 ||  || — || January 16, 2004 || Palomar || NEAT || — || align=right data-sort-value="0.81" | 810 m || 
|-id=103 bgcolor=#fefefe
| 423103 ||  || — || January 16, 2004 || Kitt Peak || Spacewatch || — || align=right data-sort-value="0.66" | 660 m || 
|-id=104 bgcolor=#fefefe
| 423104 ||  || — || January 17, 2004 || Palomar || NEAT || — || align=right data-sort-value="0.76" | 760 m || 
|-id=105 bgcolor=#d6d6d6
| 423105 ||  || — || January 17, 2004 || Palomar || NEAT || — || align=right | 4.2 km || 
|-id=106 bgcolor=#d6d6d6
| 423106 ||  || — || January 17, 2004 || Palomar || NEAT || — || align=right | 3.3 km || 
|-id=107 bgcolor=#d6d6d6
| 423107 ||  || — || January 17, 2004 || Palomar || NEAT || Tj (2.97) || align=right | 4.0 km || 
|-id=108 bgcolor=#d6d6d6
| 423108 ||  || — || January 18, 2004 || Catalina || CSS || — || align=right | 2.4 km || 
|-id=109 bgcolor=#fefefe
| 423109 ||  || — || January 17, 2004 || Palomar || NEAT || — || align=right data-sort-value="0.82" | 820 m || 
|-id=110 bgcolor=#fefefe
| 423110 ||  || — || December 18, 2003 || Socorro || LINEAR || H || align=right data-sort-value="0.65" | 650 m || 
|-id=111 bgcolor=#d6d6d6
| 423111 ||  || — || January 22, 2004 || Socorro || LINEAR || — || align=right | 2.8 km || 
|-id=112 bgcolor=#d6d6d6
| 423112 ||  || — || January 22, 2004 || Socorro || LINEAR || — || align=right | 4.8 km || 
|-id=113 bgcolor=#fefefe
| 423113 ||  || — || January 17, 2004 || Palomar || NEAT || H || align=right data-sort-value="0.90" | 900 m || 
|-id=114 bgcolor=#d6d6d6
| 423114 ||  || — || January 24, 2004 || Socorro || LINEAR || — || align=right | 3.5 km || 
|-id=115 bgcolor=#fefefe
| 423115 ||  || — || January 24, 2004 || Socorro || LINEAR || — || align=right data-sort-value="0.98" | 980 m || 
|-id=116 bgcolor=#fefefe
| 423116 ||  || — || January 27, 2004 || Kitt Peak || Spacewatch || — || align=right data-sort-value="0.69" | 690 m || 
|-id=117 bgcolor=#d6d6d6
| 423117 ||  || — || January 28, 2004 || Catalina || CSS || — || align=right | 4.9 km || 
|-id=118 bgcolor=#d6d6d6
| 423118 ||  || — || January 28, 2004 || Kitt Peak || Spacewatch || — || align=right | 3.5 km || 
|-id=119 bgcolor=#d6d6d6
| 423119 ||  || — || January 13, 2004 || Kitt Peak || Spacewatch || — || align=right | 3.1 km || 
|-id=120 bgcolor=#fefefe
| 423120 ||  || — || January 30, 2004 || Socorro || LINEAR || — || align=right | 1.0 km || 
|-id=121 bgcolor=#d6d6d6
| 423121 ||  || — || January 16, 2004 || Kitt Peak || Spacewatch || — || align=right | 3.1 km || 
|-id=122 bgcolor=#fefefe
| 423122 ||  || — || September 18, 1995 || Kitt Peak || Spacewatch || NYS || align=right data-sort-value="0.56" | 560 m || 
|-id=123 bgcolor=#d6d6d6
| 423123 ||  || — || January 19, 2004 || Kitt Peak || Spacewatch || THM || align=right | 2.4 km || 
|-id=124 bgcolor=#d6d6d6
| 423124 ||  || — || December 28, 2003 || Socorro || LINEAR || — || align=right | 3.0 km || 
|-id=125 bgcolor=#d6d6d6
| 423125 ||  || — || February 11, 2004 || Kitt Peak || Spacewatch || — || align=right | 5.0 km || 
|-id=126 bgcolor=#d6d6d6
| 423126 ||  || — || February 11, 2004 || Kitt Peak || Spacewatch || HYG || align=right | 2.9 km || 
|-id=127 bgcolor=#d6d6d6
| 423127 ||  || — || February 11, 2004 || Kitt Peak || Spacewatch || — || align=right | 2.3 km || 
|-id=128 bgcolor=#d6d6d6
| 423128 ||  || — || February 11, 2004 || Palomar || NEAT || — || align=right | 3.2 km || 
|-id=129 bgcolor=#fefefe
| 423129 ||  || — || January 30, 2004 || Kitt Peak || Spacewatch || — || align=right data-sort-value="0.76" | 760 m || 
|-id=130 bgcolor=#d6d6d6
| 423130 ||  || — || January 30, 2004 || Kitt Peak || Spacewatch || VER || align=right | 3.5 km || 
|-id=131 bgcolor=#d6d6d6
| 423131 ||  || — || February 12, 2004 || Kitt Peak || Spacewatch || LIX || align=right | 3.0 km || 
|-id=132 bgcolor=#fefefe
| 423132 ||  || — || February 13, 2004 || Kitt Peak || Spacewatch || NYS || align=right data-sort-value="0.58" | 580 m || 
|-id=133 bgcolor=#d6d6d6
| 423133 ||  || — || February 11, 2004 || Kitt Peak || Spacewatch || — || align=right | 3.0 km || 
|-id=134 bgcolor=#fefefe
| 423134 ||  || — || February 10, 2004 || Palomar || NEAT || — || align=right | 1.1 km || 
|-id=135 bgcolor=#d6d6d6
| 423135 ||  || — || February 13, 2004 || Palomar || NEAT || — || align=right | 4.4 km || 
|-id=136 bgcolor=#d6d6d6
| 423136 ||  || — || February 12, 2004 || Kitt Peak || Spacewatch || VER || align=right | 3.0 km || 
|-id=137 bgcolor=#d6d6d6
| 423137 ||  || — || February 11, 2004 || Kitt Peak || Spacewatch || — || align=right | 3.2 km || 
|-id=138 bgcolor=#d6d6d6
| 423138 ||  || — || February 14, 2004 || Socorro || LINEAR || — || align=right | 4.2 km || 
|-id=139 bgcolor=#d6d6d6
| 423139 ||  || — || February 15, 2004 || Haleakala || NEAT || — || align=right | 4.2 km || 
|-id=140 bgcolor=#d6d6d6
| 423140 ||  || — || January 24, 2004 || Socorro || LINEAR || — || align=right | 3.6 km || 
|-id=141 bgcolor=#d6d6d6
| 423141 ||  || — || February 18, 2004 || Haleakala || NEAT || — || align=right | 3.5 km || 
|-id=142 bgcolor=#fefefe
| 423142 ||  || — || February 22, 2004 || Kitt Peak || Spacewatch || NYS || align=right data-sort-value="0.71" | 710 m || 
|-id=143 bgcolor=#fefefe
| 423143 ||  || — || February 25, 2004 || Desert Eagle || W. K. Y. Yeung || NYS || align=right data-sort-value="0.61" | 610 m || 
|-id=144 bgcolor=#d6d6d6
| 423144 ||  || — || February 26, 2004 || Socorro || LINEAR || — || align=right | 2.7 km || 
|-id=145 bgcolor=#fefefe
| 423145 ||  || — || February 23, 2004 || Socorro || LINEAR || NYS || align=right data-sort-value="0.58" | 580 m || 
|-id=146 bgcolor=#fefefe
| 423146 ||  || — || March 10, 2004 || Palomar || NEAT || H || align=right data-sort-value="0.71" | 710 m || 
|-id=147 bgcolor=#d6d6d6
| 423147 ||  || — || March 11, 2004 || Palomar || NEAT || — || align=right | 3.6 km || 
|-id=148 bgcolor=#d6d6d6
| 423148 ||  || — || March 15, 2004 || Palomar || NEAT || — || align=right | 5.1 km || 
|-id=149 bgcolor=#fefefe
| 423149 ||  || — || February 13, 2004 || Kitt Peak || Spacewatch || — || align=right data-sort-value="0.90" | 900 m || 
|-id=150 bgcolor=#fefefe
| 423150 ||  || — || March 15, 2004 || Catalina || CSS || — || align=right data-sort-value="0.94" | 940 m || 
|-id=151 bgcolor=#d6d6d6
| 423151 ||  || — || March 15, 2004 || Palomar || NEAT || — || align=right | 3.8 km || 
|-id=152 bgcolor=#fefefe
| 423152 ||  || — || March 15, 2004 || Kitt Peak || Spacewatch || — || align=right data-sort-value="0.87" | 870 m || 
|-id=153 bgcolor=#d6d6d6
| 423153 ||  || — || March 14, 2004 || Kitt Peak || Spacewatch || — || align=right | 2.7 km || 
|-id=154 bgcolor=#fefefe
| 423154 ||  || — || March 15, 2004 || Catalina || CSS || NYS || align=right data-sort-value="0.77" | 770 m || 
|-id=155 bgcolor=#fefefe
| 423155 ||  || — || March 15, 2004 || Socorro || LINEAR || — || align=right data-sort-value="0.84" | 840 m || 
|-id=156 bgcolor=#fefefe
| 423156 ||  || — || March 14, 2004 || Kitt Peak || Spacewatch || — || align=right data-sort-value="0.86" | 860 m || 
|-id=157 bgcolor=#fefefe
| 423157 ||  || — || March 14, 2004 || Kitt Peak || Spacewatch || NYS || align=right data-sort-value="0.64" | 640 m || 
|-id=158 bgcolor=#fefefe
| 423158 ||  || — || March 12, 2004 || Palomar || NEAT || NYS || align=right data-sort-value="0.63" | 630 m || 
|-id=159 bgcolor=#d6d6d6
| 423159 ||  || — || March 15, 2004 || Kitt Peak || Spacewatch || THM || align=right | 2.0 km || 
|-id=160 bgcolor=#d6d6d6
| 423160 ||  || — || March 14, 2004 || Kitt Peak || Spacewatch || — || align=right | 2.9 km || 
|-id=161 bgcolor=#d6d6d6
| 423161 || 2004 FG || — || March 16, 2004 || Junk Bond || D. Healy || — || align=right | 2.9 km || 
|-id=162 bgcolor=#FA8072
| 423162 ||  || — || March 17, 2004 || Socorro || LINEAR || — || align=right data-sort-value="0.75" | 750 m || 
|-id=163 bgcolor=#fefefe
| 423163 ||  || — || March 25, 2004 || Wrightwood || J. W. Young || — || align=right data-sort-value="0.70" | 700 m || 
|-id=164 bgcolor=#fefefe
| 423164 ||  || — || February 19, 2004 || Socorro || LINEAR || — || align=right | 1.4 km || 
|-id=165 bgcolor=#d6d6d6
| 423165 ||  || — || March 17, 2004 || Socorro || LINEAR || — || align=right | 4.6 km || 
|-id=166 bgcolor=#fefefe
| 423166 ||  || — || March 16, 2004 || Socorro || LINEAR || — || align=right data-sort-value="0.93" | 930 m || 
|-id=167 bgcolor=#fefefe
| 423167 ||  || — || March 17, 2004 || Socorro || LINEAR || — || align=right | 1.00 km || 
|-id=168 bgcolor=#fefefe
| 423168 ||  || — || March 19, 2004 || Socorro || LINEAR || — || align=right data-sort-value="0.90" | 900 m || 
|-id=169 bgcolor=#fefefe
| 423169 ||  || — || March 17, 2004 || Kitt Peak || Spacewatch || MAS || align=right data-sort-value="0.75" | 750 m || 
|-id=170 bgcolor=#E9E9E9
| 423170 ||  || — || March 17, 2004 || Kitt Peak || Spacewatch || — || align=right | 1.3 km || 
|-id=171 bgcolor=#E9E9E9
| 423171 ||  || — || March 18, 2004 || Palomar || NEAT || — || align=right | 1.2 km || 
|-id=172 bgcolor=#fefefe
| 423172 ||  || — || March 17, 2004 || Kitt Peak || Spacewatch || MAS || align=right data-sort-value="0.74" | 740 m || 
|-id=173 bgcolor=#fefefe
| 423173 ||  || — || March 25, 2004 || Siding Spring || SSS || — || align=right data-sort-value="0.91" | 910 m || 
|-id=174 bgcolor=#d6d6d6
| 423174 ||  || — || April 11, 2004 || Palomar || NEAT || — || align=right | 4.3 km || 
|-id=175 bgcolor=#d6d6d6
| 423175 ||  || — || April 12, 2004 || Kitt Peak || Spacewatch || THB || align=right | 3.2 km || 
|-id=176 bgcolor=#fefefe
| 423176 ||  || — || April 15, 2004 || Socorro || LINEAR || — || align=right | 1.0 km || 
|-id=177 bgcolor=#fefefe
| 423177 ||  || — || March 27, 2004 || Socorro || LINEAR || — || align=right data-sort-value="0.97" | 970 m || 
|-id=178 bgcolor=#d6d6d6
| 423178 ||  || — || April 13, 2004 || Kitt Peak || Spacewatch || — || align=right | 2.3 km || 
|-id=179 bgcolor=#d6d6d6
| 423179 ||  || — || April 15, 2004 || Socorro || LINEAR || — || align=right | 1.8 km || 
|-id=180 bgcolor=#d6d6d6
| 423180 ||  || — || April 15, 2004 || Socorro || LINEAR || — || align=right | 3.4 km || 
|-id=181 bgcolor=#d6d6d6
| 423181 ||  || — || April 14, 2004 || Kitt Peak || Spacewatch || HYG || align=right | 3.2 km || 
|-id=182 bgcolor=#fefefe
| 423182 ||  || — || April 21, 2004 || Socorro || LINEAR || — || align=right | 1.2 km || 
|-id=183 bgcolor=#d6d6d6
| 423183 ||  || — || May 13, 2004 || Kitt Peak || Spacewatch || THM || align=right | 2.3 km || 
|-id=184 bgcolor=#E9E9E9
| 423184 ||  || — || May 13, 2004 || Kitt Peak || Spacewatch || — || align=right | 1.4 km || 
|-id=185 bgcolor=#d6d6d6
| 423185 ||  || — || May 18, 2004 || Socorro || LINEAR || — || align=right | 4.9 km || 
|-id=186 bgcolor=#d6d6d6
| 423186 ||  || — || June 9, 2004 || Socorro || LINEAR || — || align=right | 3.9 km || 
|-id=187 bgcolor=#E9E9E9
| 423187 ||  || — || June 11, 2004 || Campo Imperatore || CINEOS || — || align=right | 2.2 km || 
|-id=188 bgcolor=#E9E9E9
| 423188 ||  || — || July 10, 2004 || Needville || J. Dellinger, M. Eastman || — || align=right | 2.2 km || 
|-id=189 bgcolor=#E9E9E9
| 423189 ||  || — || July 11, 2004 || Socorro || LINEAR || JUN || align=right | 1.3 km || 
|-id=190 bgcolor=#FA8072
| 423190 ||  || — || July 14, 2004 || Socorro || LINEAR || — || align=right | 2.5 km || 
|-id=191 bgcolor=#E9E9E9
| 423191 ||  || — || June 25, 2004 || Kitt Peak || Spacewatch || — || align=right | 1.8 km || 
|-id=192 bgcolor=#E9E9E9
| 423192 ||  || — || July 11, 2004 || Socorro || LINEAR || — || align=right | 1.2 km || 
|-id=193 bgcolor=#E9E9E9
| 423193 ||  || — || July 15, 2004 || Socorro || LINEAR || — || align=right | 2.5 km || 
|-id=194 bgcolor=#E9E9E9
| 423194 ||  || — || July 16, 2004 || Cerro Tololo || M. W. Buie || — || align=right | 2.3 km || 
|-id=195 bgcolor=#E9E9E9
| 423195 ||  || — || August 6, 2004 || Palomar || NEAT || MAR || align=right | 1.3 km || 
|-id=196 bgcolor=#E9E9E9
| 423196 ||  || — || August 7, 2004 || Palomar || NEAT || — || align=right | 2.8 km || 
|-id=197 bgcolor=#E9E9E9
| 423197 ||  || — || August 10, 2004 || Wrightwood || M. Vale || — || align=right data-sort-value="0.95" | 950 m || 
|-id=198 bgcolor=#E9E9E9
| 423198 ||  || — || August 8, 2004 || Socorro || LINEAR || MRX || align=right | 1.3 km || 
|-id=199 bgcolor=#E9E9E9
| 423199 ||  || — || August 8, 2004 || Anderson Mesa || LONEOS || — || align=right | 2.0 km || 
|-id=200 bgcolor=#E9E9E9
| 423200 ||  || — || August 8, 2004 || Palomar || NEAT || — || align=right | 1.4 km || 
|}

423201–423300 

|-bgcolor=#E9E9E9
| 423201 ||  || — || July 17, 2004 || Socorro || LINEAR || JUN || align=right | 1.2 km || 
|-id=202 bgcolor=#E9E9E9
| 423202 ||  || — || August 9, 2004 || Socorro || LINEAR || — || align=right | 2.2 km || 
|-id=203 bgcolor=#E9E9E9
| 423203 ||  || — || August 25, 2004 || Kitt Peak || Spacewatch || — || align=right | 1.8 km || 
|-id=204 bgcolor=#E9E9E9
| 423204 ||  || — || August 23, 2004 || Kitt Peak || Spacewatch || — || align=right | 1.3 km || 
|-id=205 bgcolor=#E9E9E9
| 423205 Echezeaux ||  ||  || September 5, 2004 || Vicques || M. Ory || — || align=right | 2.9 km || 
|-id=206 bgcolor=#E9E9E9
| 423206 ||  || — || July 20, 2004 || Siding Spring || SSS || — || align=right | 2.3 km || 
|-id=207 bgcolor=#E9E9E9
| 423207 ||  || — || September 6, 2004 || Vicques || M. Ory || — || align=right | 1.8 km || 
|-id=208 bgcolor=#E9E9E9
| 423208 ||  || — || September 8, 2004 || Socorro || LINEAR || — || align=right | 2.2 km || 
|-id=209 bgcolor=#E9E9E9
| 423209 ||  || — || September 8, 2004 || Socorro || LINEAR || — || align=right | 2.5 km || 
|-id=210 bgcolor=#FFC2E0
| 423210 ||  || — || September 10, 2004 || Socorro || LINEAR || AMOcritical || align=right data-sort-value="0.56" | 560 m || 
|-id=211 bgcolor=#E9E9E9
| 423211 ||  || — || September 6, 2004 || Socorro || LINEAR || — || align=right | 2.6 km || 
|-id=212 bgcolor=#E9E9E9
| 423212 ||  || — || September 7, 2004 || Kitt Peak || Spacewatch || — || align=right | 1.4 km || 
|-id=213 bgcolor=#E9E9E9
| 423213 ||  || — || September 8, 2004 || Palomar || NEAT || EUN || align=right | 1.5 km || 
|-id=214 bgcolor=#E9E9E9
| 423214 ||  || — || August 10, 2004 || Socorro || LINEAR || — || align=right | 2.1 km || 
|-id=215 bgcolor=#E9E9E9
| 423215 ||  || — || September 9, 2004 || Socorro || LINEAR || — || align=right | 1.8 km || 
|-id=216 bgcolor=#E9E9E9
| 423216 ||  || — || September 10, 2004 || Socorro || LINEAR || DOR || align=right | 2.1 km || 
|-id=217 bgcolor=#E9E9E9
| 423217 ||  || — || September 10, 2004 || Socorro || LINEAR || — || align=right | 1.8 km || 
|-id=218 bgcolor=#E9E9E9
| 423218 ||  || — || September 10, 2004 || Socorro || LINEAR || — || align=right | 1.7 km || 
|-id=219 bgcolor=#E9E9E9
| 423219 ||  || — || September 10, 2004 || Socorro || LINEAR || DOR || align=right | 2.4 km || 
|-id=220 bgcolor=#E9E9E9
| 423220 ||  || — || September 10, 2004 || Socorro || LINEAR || — || align=right | 2.3 km || 
|-id=221 bgcolor=#E9E9E9
| 423221 ||  || — || September 10, 2004 || Kitt Peak || Spacewatch || — || align=right | 2.6 km || 
|-id=222 bgcolor=#fefefe
| 423222 ||  || — || August 23, 2004 || Kitt Peak || Spacewatch || — || align=right data-sort-value="0.62" | 620 m || 
|-id=223 bgcolor=#E9E9E9
| 423223 ||  || — || September 8, 2004 || Palomar || NEAT || — || align=right | 1.7 km || 
|-id=224 bgcolor=#E9E9E9
| 423224 ||  || — || September 11, 2004 || Socorro || LINEAR || — || align=right | 1.5 km || 
|-id=225 bgcolor=#E9E9E9
| 423225 ||  || — || September 9, 2004 || Kitt Peak || Spacewatch || — || align=right | 1.4 km || 
|-id=226 bgcolor=#E9E9E9
| 423226 ||  || — || September 10, 2004 || Kitt Peak || Spacewatch || — || align=right | 1.5 km || 
|-id=227 bgcolor=#E9E9E9
| 423227 ||  || — || September 11, 2004 || Kitt Peak || Spacewatch || — || align=right | 1.1 km || 
|-id=228 bgcolor=#E9E9E9
| 423228 ||  || — || September 11, 2004 || Kitt Peak || Spacewatch || — || align=right | 1.1 km || 
|-id=229 bgcolor=#E9E9E9
| 423229 ||  || — || September 10, 2004 || Socorro || LINEAR || — || align=right | 2.4 km || 
|-id=230 bgcolor=#E9E9E9
| 423230 ||  || — || September 13, 2004 || Socorro || LINEAR || — || align=right | 3.0 km || 
|-id=231 bgcolor=#E9E9E9
| 423231 ||  || — || September 11, 2004 || Socorro || LINEAR || — || align=right | 2.2 km || 
|-id=232 bgcolor=#E9E9E9
| 423232 ||  || — || September 18, 2004 || Socorro || LINEAR || MAR || align=right | 1.2 km || 
|-id=233 bgcolor=#E9E9E9
| 423233 ||  || — || September 22, 2004 || Desert Eagle || W. K. Y. Yeung || AEO || align=right | 1.3 km || 
|-id=234 bgcolor=#E9E9E9
| 423234 ||  || — || September 17, 2004 || Socorro || LINEAR || — || align=right | 2.5 km || 
|-id=235 bgcolor=#E9E9E9
| 423235 ||  || — || September 17, 2004 || Kitt Peak || Spacewatch || — || align=right | 1.8 km || 
|-id=236 bgcolor=#E9E9E9
| 423236 ||  || — || September 10, 2004 || Socorro || LINEAR || — || align=right | 2.6 km || 
|-id=237 bgcolor=#E9E9E9
| 423237 ||  || — || September 23, 2004 || Kitt Peak || Spacewatch || — || align=right | 1.1 km || 
|-id=238 bgcolor=#E9E9E9
| 423238 ||  || — || September 15, 2004 || Socorro || LINEAR || MAR || align=right | 1.1 km || 
|-id=239 bgcolor=#E9E9E9
| 423239 ||  || — || October 4, 2004 || Kitt Peak || Spacewatch || — || align=right | 1.8 km || 
|-id=240 bgcolor=#E9E9E9
| 423240 ||  || — || September 17, 2004 || Kitt Peak || Spacewatch || — || align=right | 2.1 km || 
|-id=241 bgcolor=#E9E9E9
| 423241 ||  || — || October 4, 2004 || Socorro || LINEAR || — || align=right | 2.6 km || 
|-id=242 bgcolor=#E9E9E9
| 423242 ||  || — || October 5, 2004 || Kitt Peak || Spacewatch || — || align=right | 2.5 km || 
|-id=243 bgcolor=#E9E9E9
| 423243 ||  || — || October 5, 2004 || Kitt Peak || Spacewatch || — || align=right | 2.7 km || 
|-id=244 bgcolor=#fefefe
| 423244 ||  || — || October 8, 2004 || Anderson Mesa || LONEOS || — || align=right data-sort-value="0.79" | 790 m || 
|-id=245 bgcolor=#E9E9E9
| 423245 ||  || — || October 4, 2004 || Kitt Peak || Spacewatch ||  || align=right | 2.0 km || 
|-id=246 bgcolor=#E9E9E9
| 423246 ||  || — || September 22, 2004 || Kitt Peak || Spacewatch || — || align=right | 1.9 km || 
|-id=247 bgcolor=#fefefe
| 423247 ||  || — || October 5, 2004 || Kitt Peak || Spacewatch || — || align=right data-sort-value="0.64" | 640 m || 
|-id=248 bgcolor=#E9E9E9
| 423248 ||  || — || September 23, 2004 || Kitt Peak || Spacewatch || — || align=right | 1.6 km || 
|-id=249 bgcolor=#E9E9E9
| 423249 ||  || — || October 6, 2004 || Kitt Peak || Spacewatch || HOF || align=right | 2.2 km || 
|-id=250 bgcolor=#E9E9E9
| 423250 ||  || — || October 7, 2004 || Kitt Peak || Spacewatch || AGN || align=right | 1.0 km || 
|-id=251 bgcolor=#E9E9E9
| 423251 ||  || — || October 7, 2004 || Kitt Peak || Spacewatch || WIT || align=right | 1.0 km || 
|-id=252 bgcolor=#E9E9E9
| 423252 ||  || — || October 7, 2004 || Kitt Peak || Spacewatch || — || align=right | 2.7 km || 
|-id=253 bgcolor=#fefefe
| 423253 ||  || — || October 7, 2004 || Kitt Peak || Spacewatch || — || align=right data-sort-value="0.56" | 560 m || 
|-id=254 bgcolor=#fefefe
| 423254 ||  || — || October 7, 2004 || Kitt Peak || Spacewatch || — || align=right data-sort-value="0.67" | 670 m || 
|-id=255 bgcolor=#E9E9E9
| 423255 ||  || — || October 7, 2004 || Kitt Peak || Spacewatch || — || align=right | 2.1 km || 
|-id=256 bgcolor=#fefefe
| 423256 ||  || — || October 9, 2004 || Kitt Peak || Spacewatch || — || align=right data-sort-value="0.81" | 810 m || 
|-id=257 bgcolor=#E9E9E9
| 423257 ||  || — || October 9, 2004 || Kitt Peak || Spacewatch || — || align=right | 2.2 km || 
|-id=258 bgcolor=#E9E9E9
| 423258 ||  || — || October 7, 2004 || Palomar || NEAT || ADE || align=right | 2.5 km || 
|-id=259 bgcolor=#E9E9E9
| 423259 ||  || — || October 10, 2004 || Kitt Peak || Spacewatch || AGN || align=right | 1.1 km || 
|-id=260 bgcolor=#E9E9E9
| 423260 ||  || — || October 10, 2004 || Kitt Peak || Spacewatch || — || align=right | 2.1 km || 
|-id=261 bgcolor=#E9E9E9
| 423261 ||  || — || October 11, 2004 || Kitt Peak || Spacewatch || — || align=right | 2.4 km || 
|-id=262 bgcolor=#E9E9E9
| 423262 ||  || — || October 4, 2004 || Kitt Peak || Spacewatch || AEO || align=right | 1.3 km || 
|-id=263 bgcolor=#E9E9E9
| 423263 ||  || — || October 14, 2004 || Kitt Peak || Spacewatch || — || align=right | 1.4 km || 
|-id=264 bgcolor=#E9E9E9
| 423264 ||  || — || August 22, 2004 || Kitt Peak || Spacewatch || — || align=right | 2.7 km || 
|-id=265 bgcolor=#E9E9E9
| 423265 ||  || — || September 17, 2004 || Kitt Peak || Spacewatch || AGN || align=right | 1.0 km || 
|-id=266 bgcolor=#fefefe
| 423266 ||  || — || November 3, 2004 || Kitt Peak || Spacewatch || — || align=right data-sort-value="0.67" | 670 m || 
|-id=267 bgcolor=#E9E9E9
| 423267 ||  || — || November 3, 2004 || Palomar || NEAT || — || align=right | 2.1 km || 
|-id=268 bgcolor=#E9E9E9
| 423268 ||  || — || November 4, 2004 || Catalina || CSS || — || align=right | 2.1 km || 
|-id=269 bgcolor=#E9E9E9
| 423269 ||  || — || November 8, 2004 || Vicques || M. Ory || — || align=right | 2.4 km || 
|-id=270 bgcolor=#fefefe
| 423270 ||  || — || October 15, 2004 || Mount Lemmon || Mount Lemmon Survey || — || align=right data-sort-value="0.49" | 490 m || 
|-id=271 bgcolor=#d6d6d6
| 423271 ||  || — || November 4, 2004 || Kitt Peak || Spacewatch || EOS || align=right | 2.6 km || 
|-id=272 bgcolor=#fefefe
| 423272 ||  || — || November 4, 2004 || Kitt Peak || Spacewatch || — || align=right data-sort-value="0.50" | 500 m || 
|-id=273 bgcolor=#fefefe
| 423273 ||  || — || November 11, 2004 || Kitt Peak || Spacewatch || — || align=right data-sort-value="0.71" | 710 m || 
|-id=274 bgcolor=#E9E9E9
| 423274 ||  || — || November 11, 2004 || Kitt Peak || Spacewatch || — || align=right | 2.0 km || 
|-id=275 bgcolor=#d6d6d6
| 423275 ||  || — || October 15, 2004 || Kitt Peak || Spacewatch || — || align=right | 3.0 km || 
|-id=276 bgcolor=#E9E9E9
| 423276 ||  || — || November 17, 2004 || Campo Imperatore || CINEOS || — || align=right | 2.5 km || 
|-id=277 bgcolor=#E9E9E9
| 423277 ||  || — || December 3, 2004 || Nashville || R. Clingan || — || align=right | 2.1 km || 
|-id=278 bgcolor=#fefefe
| 423278 ||  || — || December 7, 2004 || Socorro || LINEAR || — || align=right data-sort-value="0.74" | 740 m || 
|-id=279 bgcolor=#fefefe
| 423279 ||  || — || December 10, 2004 || Socorro || LINEAR || — || align=right | 1.1 km || 
|-id=280 bgcolor=#d6d6d6
| 423280 ||  || — || December 18, 2004 || Mount Lemmon || Mount Lemmon Survey || — || align=right | 3.5 km || 
|-id=281 bgcolor=#E9E9E9
| 423281 ||  || — || December 18, 2004 || Mount Lemmon || Mount Lemmon Survey || — || align=right | 2.3 km || 
|-id=282 bgcolor=#d6d6d6
| 423282 ||  || — || December 18, 2004 || Mount Lemmon || Mount Lemmon Survey || — || align=right | 2.1 km || 
|-id=283 bgcolor=#fefefe
| 423283 ||  || — || January 10, 2005 || Kitami || K. Endate || H || align=right data-sort-value="0.90" | 900 m || 
|-id=284 bgcolor=#d6d6d6
| 423284 ||  || — || January 15, 2005 || Kitt Peak || Spacewatch || EOS || align=right | 1.9 km || 
|-id=285 bgcolor=#E9E9E9
| 423285 ||  || — || January 16, 2005 || Kitt Peak || Spacewatch || — || align=right | 2.9 km || 
|-id=286 bgcolor=#fefefe
| 423286 ||  || — || February 2, 2005 || Socorro || LINEAR || H || align=right data-sort-value="0.77" | 770 m || 
|-id=287 bgcolor=#d6d6d6
| 423287 ||  || — || February 1, 2005 || Kitt Peak || Spacewatch || — || align=right | 2.6 km || 
|-id=288 bgcolor=#fefefe
| 423288 ||  || — || March 1, 2005 || Kitt Peak || Spacewatch || — || align=right data-sort-value="0.87" | 870 m || 
|-id=289 bgcolor=#d6d6d6
| 423289 ||  || — || March 3, 2005 || Kitt Peak || Spacewatch || — || align=right | 2.5 km || 
|-id=290 bgcolor=#d6d6d6
| 423290 ||  || — || March 3, 2005 || Kitt Peak || Spacewatch || — || align=right | 2.3 km || 
|-id=291 bgcolor=#d6d6d6
| 423291 ||  || — || March 3, 2005 || Kitt Peak || Spacewatch || — || align=right | 3.4 km || 
|-id=292 bgcolor=#d6d6d6
| 423292 ||  || — || March 3, 2005 || Catalina || CSS || — || align=right | 2.8 km || 
|-id=293 bgcolor=#d6d6d6
| 423293 ||  || — || March 3, 2005 || Catalina || CSS || — || align=right | 2.7 km || 
|-id=294 bgcolor=#d6d6d6
| 423294 ||  || — || February 2, 2005 || Kitt Peak || Spacewatch || THM || align=right | 2.2 km || 
|-id=295 bgcolor=#d6d6d6
| 423295 ||  || — || March 4, 2005 || Socorro || LINEAR || — || align=right | 2.7 km || 
|-id=296 bgcolor=#d6d6d6
| 423296 ||  || — || March 4, 2005 || Mount Lemmon || Mount Lemmon Survey || — || align=right | 3.1 km || 
|-id=297 bgcolor=#fefefe
| 423297 ||  || — || March 8, 2005 || Anderson Mesa || LONEOS || H || align=right data-sort-value="0.77" | 770 m || 
|-id=298 bgcolor=#fefefe
| 423298 ||  || — || March 11, 2005 || Catalina || CSS || — || align=right | 1.0 km || 
|-id=299 bgcolor=#d6d6d6
| 423299 ||  || — || March 4, 2005 || Kitt Peak || Spacewatch || — || align=right | 2.8 km || 
|-id=300 bgcolor=#d6d6d6
| 423300 ||  || — || March 9, 2005 || Kitt Peak || Spacewatch || — || align=right | 3.1 km || 
|}

423301–423400 

|-bgcolor=#d6d6d6
| 423301 ||  || — || March 9, 2005 || Mount Lemmon || Mount Lemmon Survey || — || align=right | 3.4 km || 
|-id=302 bgcolor=#fefefe
| 423302 ||  || — || March 10, 2005 || Catalina || CSS || — || align=right data-sort-value="0.72" | 720 m || 
|-id=303 bgcolor=#d6d6d6
| 423303 ||  || — || March 10, 2005 || Mount Lemmon || Mount Lemmon Survey || EOS || align=right | 1.9 km || 
|-id=304 bgcolor=#d6d6d6
| 423304 ||  || — || March 10, 2005 || Kitt Peak || Spacewatch || — || align=right | 2.7 km || 
|-id=305 bgcolor=#d6d6d6
| 423305 ||  || — || March 10, 2005 || Kitt Peak || Spacewatch || — || align=right | 3.6 km || 
|-id=306 bgcolor=#fefefe
| 423306 ||  || — || March 9, 2005 || Mount Lemmon || Mount Lemmon Survey || — || align=right data-sort-value="0.71" | 710 m || 
|-id=307 bgcolor=#fefefe
| 423307 ||  || — || March 9, 2005 || Kitt Peak || Spacewatch || — || align=right data-sort-value="0.68" | 680 m || 
|-id=308 bgcolor=#d6d6d6
| 423308 ||  || — || March 9, 2005 || Socorro || LINEAR || — || align=right | 2.9 km || 
|-id=309 bgcolor=#fefefe
| 423309 ||  || — || March 11, 2005 || Mount Lemmon || Mount Lemmon Survey || — || align=right data-sort-value="0.68" | 680 m || 
|-id=310 bgcolor=#d6d6d6
| 423310 ||  || — || March 10, 2005 || Mount Lemmon || Mount Lemmon Survey || — || align=right | 3.8 km || 
|-id=311 bgcolor=#fefefe
| 423311 ||  || — || March 9, 2005 || Mount Lemmon || Mount Lemmon Survey || — || align=right data-sort-value="0.68" | 680 m || 
|-id=312 bgcolor=#fefefe
| 423312 ||  || — || March 10, 2005 || Anderson Mesa || LONEOS || — || align=right | 1.0 km || 
|-id=313 bgcolor=#d6d6d6
| 423313 ||  || — || March 11, 2005 || Kitt Peak || Spacewatch || EOS || align=right | 2.1 km || 
|-id=314 bgcolor=#d6d6d6
| 423314 ||  || — || March 11, 2005 || Kitt Peak || Spacewatch || — || align=right | 3.0 km || 
|-id=315 bgcolor=#d6d6d6
| 423315 ||  || — || March 12, 2005 || Kitt Peak || Spacewatch || — || align=right | 2.1 km || 
|-id=316 bgcolor=#fefefe
| 423316 ||  || — || March 11, 2005 || Kitt Peak || Spacewatch || — || align=right data-sort-value="0.65" | 650 m || 
|-id=317 bgcolor=#d6d6d6
| 423317 ||  || — || March 12, 2005 || Mount Lemmon || Mount Lemmon Survey ||  || align=right | 4.2 km || 
|-id=318 bgcolor=#d6d6d6
| 423318 ||  || — || March 10, 2005 || Anderson Mesa || LONEOS || — || align=right | 3.5 km || 
|-id=319 bgcolor=#d6d6d6
| 423319 ||  || — || March 10, 2005 || Kitt Peak || M. W. Buie || — || align=right | 2.3 km || 
|-id=320 bgcolor=#d6d6d6
| 423320 ||  || — || March 11, 2005 || Kitt Peak || Spacewatch || — || align=right | 2.6 km || 
|-id=321 bgcolor=#FFC2E0
| 423321 ||  || — || March 10, 2005 || Anderson Mesa || LONEOS || AMOPHA || align=right data-sort-value="0.2" | 200 m || 
|-id=322 bgcolor=#d6d6d6
| 423322 || 2005 FQ || — || March 16, 2005 || Saint-Sulpice || Saint-Sulpice Obs. || — || align=right | 2.8 km || 
|-id=323 bgcolor=#d6d6d6
| 423323 ||  || — || March 16, 2005 || Mount Lemmon || Mount Lemmon Survey || — || align=right | 3.8 km || 
|-id=324 bgcolor=#fefefe
| 423324 ||  || — || March 31, 2005 || Kitt Peak || Spacewatch || — || align=right data-sort-value="0.83" | 830 m || 
|-id=325 bgcolor=#fefefe
| 423325 ||  || — || April 2, 2005 || Siding Spring || R. H. McNaught || H || align=right data-sort-value="0.95" | 950 m || 
|-id=326 bgcolor=#d6d6d6
| 423326 ||  || — || April 1, 2005 || Anderson Mesa || LONEOS || — || align=right | 3.0 km || 
|-id=327 bgcolor=#d6d6d6
| 423327 ||  || — || April 1, 2005 || Kitt Peak || Spacewatch || — || align=right | 3.6 km || 
|-id=328 bgcolor=#d6d6d6
| 423328 ||  || — || April 2, 2005 || Kitt Peak || Spacewatch || critical || align=right | 2.3 km || 
|-id=329 bgcolor=#fefefe
| 423329 ||  || — || April 2, 2005 || Mount Lemmon || Mount Lemmon Survey || — || align=right data-sort-value="0.56" | 560 m || 
|-id=330 bgcolor=#fefefe
| 423330 ||  || — || April 3, 2005 || Palomar || NEAT || — || align=right data-sort-value="0.97" | 970 m || 
|-id=331 bgcolor=#d6d6d6
| 423331 ||  || — || March 13, 2005 || Kitt Peak || Spacewatch || EOS || align=right | 2.0 km || 
|-id=332 bgcolor=#d6d6d6
| 423332 ||  || — || April 1, 2005 || Kitt Peak || Spacewatch || THM || align=right | 2.2 km || 
|-id=333 bgcolor=#fefefe
| 423333 ||  || — || April 5, 2005 || Mount Lemmon || Mount Lemmon Survey || — || align=right data-sort-value="0.60" | 600 m || 
|-id=334 bgcolor=#d6d6d6
| 423334 ||  || — || April 5, 2005 || Mount Lemmon || Mount Lemmon Survey || EOS || align=right | 4.0 km || 
|-id=335 bgcolor=#d6d6d6
| 423335 ||  || — || April 5, 2005 || Mount Lemmon || Mount Lemmon Survey || — || align=right | 2.4 km || 
|-id=336 bgcolor=#d6d6d6
| 423336 ||  || — || January 28, 2004 || Kitt Peak || Spacewatch || THM || align=right | 2.1 km || 
|-id=337 bgcolor=#fefefe
| 423337 ||  || — || March 14, 2005 || Mount Lemmon || Mount Lemmon Survey || — || align=right data-sort-value="0.67" | 670 m || 
|-id=338 bgcolor=#fefefe
| 423338 ||  || — || April 2, 2005 || Catalina || CSS || — || align=right | 1.0 km || 
|-id=339 bgcolor=#fefefe
| 423339 ||  || — || April 4, 2005 || Kitt Peak || Spacewatch || — || align=right data-sort-value="0.64" | 640 m || 
|-id=340 bgcolor=#d6d6d6
| 423340 ||  || — || April 4, 2005 || Mount Lemmon || Mount Lemmon Survey || LIX || align=right | 3.6 km || 
|-id=341 bgcolor=#d6d6d6
| 423341 ||  || — || April 10, 2005 || Kitt Peak || Spacewatch || — || align=right | 2.6 km || 
|-id=342 bgcolor=#d6d6d6
| 423342 ||  || — || April 10, 2005 || Kitt Peak || Spacewatch || — || align=right | 2.7 km || 
|-id=343 bgcolor=#fefefe
| 423343 ||  || — || April 13, 2005 || Socorro || LINEAR || — || align=right data-sort-value="0.80" | 800 m || 
|-id=344 bgcolor=#d6d6d6
| 423344 ||  || — || April 10, 2005 || Kitt Peak || Spacewatch || HYG || align=right | 3.3 km || 
|-id=345 bgcolor=#fefefe
| 423345 ||  || — || April 2, 2005 || Kitt Peak || Spacewatch || — || align=right data-sort-value="0.84" | 840 m || 
|-id=346 bgcolor=#d6d6d6
| 423346 ||  || — || April 11, 2005 || Kitt Peak || Spacewatch || — || align=right | 3.0 km || 
|-id=347 bgcolor=#fefefe
| 423347 ||  || — || April 11, 2005 || Kitt Peak || Spacewatch || — || align=right data-sort-value="0.74" | 740 m || 
|-id=348 bgcolor=#d6d6d6
| 423348 ||  || — || April 11, 2005 || Kitt Peak || Spacewatch || — || align=right | 3.8 km || 
|-id=349 bgcolor=#d6d6d6
| 423349 ||  || — || April 11, 2005 || Kitt Peak || Spacewatch || — || align=right | 2.5 km || 
|-id=350 bgcolor=#fefefe
| 423350 ||  || — || April 12, 2005 || Kitt Peak || Spacewatch || — || align=right data-sort-value="0.78" | 780 m || 
|-id=351 bgcolor=#d6d6d6
| 423351 ||  || — || April 15, 2005 || Siding Spring || SSS || — || align=right | 5.3 km || 
|-id=352 bgcolor=#d6d6d6
| 423352 ||  || — || April 12, 2005 || Kitt Peak || Spacewatch || — || align=right | 3.8 km || 
|-id=353 bgcolor=#d6d6d6
| 423353 ||  || — || April 12, 2005 || Anderson Mesa || LONEOS || — || align=right | 4.4 km || 
|-id=354 bgcolor=#FA8072
| 423354 ||  || — || April 30, 2005 || Socorro || LINEAR || H || align=right data-sort-value="0.79" | 790 m || 
|-id=355 bgcolor=#d6d6d6
| 423355 ||  || — || April 16, 2005 || Kitt Peak || Spacewatch || — || align=right | 2.3 km || 
|-id=356 bgcolor=#d6d6d6
| 423356 ||  || — || May 3, 2005 || Kitt Peak || Spacewatch || — || align=right | 3.9 km || 
|-id=357 bgcolor=#d6d6d6
| 423357 ||  || — || May 5, 2005 || Needville || Needville Obs. || — || align=right | 1.9 km || 
|-id=358 bgcolor=#fefefe
| 423358 ||  || — || May 4, 2005 || Mauna Kea || C. Veillet || — || align=right data-sort-value="0.50" | 500 m || 
|-id=359 bgcolor=#d6d6d6
| 423359 ||  || — || May 2, 2005 || Kitt Peak || Spacewatch || — || align=right | 2.6 km || 
|-id=360 bgcolor=#d6d6d6
| 423360 ||  || — || May 4, 2005 || Mount Lemmon || Mount Lemmon Survey || — || align=right | 2.5 km || 
|-id=361 bgcolor=#d6d6d6
| 423361 ||  || — || May 2, 2005 || Kitt Peak || Spacewatch || — || align=right | 3.3 km || 
|-id=362 bgcolor=#d6d6d6
| 423362 ||  || — || May 3, 2005 || Kitt Peak || Spacewatch || VER || align=right | 2.4 km || 
|-id=363 bgcolor=#d6d6d6
| 423363 ||  || — || May 4, 2005 || Kitt Peak || Spacewatch || — || align=right | 3.5 km || 
|-id=364 bgcolor=#fefefe
| 423364 ||  || — || May 4, 2005 || Kitt Peak || Spacewatch || — || align=right data-sort-value="0.80" | 800 m || 
|-id=365 bgcolor=#fefefe
| 423365 ||  || — || April 14, 2005 || Kitt Peak || Spacewatch || — || align=right data-sort-value="0.86" | 860 m || 
|-id=366 bgcolor=#d6d6d6
| 423366 ||  || — || May 7, 2005 || Kitt Peak || Spacewatch || — || align=right | 3.7 km || 
|-id=367 bgcolor=#d6d6d6
| 423367 ||  || — || May 8, 2005 || Anderson Mesa || LONEOS || — || align=right | 2.5 km || 
|-id=368 bgcolor=#d6d6d6
| 423368 ||  || — || May 7, 2005 || Catalina || CSS || Tj (2.98) || align=right | 5.1 km || 
|-id=369 bgcolor=#fefefe
| 423369 ||  || — || May 3, 2005 || Kitt Peak || Spacewatch || NYS || align=right data-sort-value="0.55" | 550 m || 
|-id=370 bgcolor=#d6d6d6
| 423370 ||  || — || April 18, 2005 || Kitt Peak || Spacewatch || — || align=right | 3.4 km || 
|-id=371 bgcolor=#d6d6d6
| 423371 ||  || — || May 4, 2005 || Kitt Peak || Spacewatch || — || align=right | 2.8 km || 
|-id=372 bgcolor=#d6d6d6
| 423372 ||  || — || May 4, 2005 || Kitt Peak || Spacewatch || — || align=right | 4.0 km || 
|-id=373 bgcolor=#d6d6d6
| 423373 ||  || — || May 6, 2005 || Kitt Peak || Spacewatch || — || align=right | 2.7 km || 
|-id=374 bgcolor=#fefefe
| 423374 ||  || — || May 7, 2005 || Kitt Peak || Spacewatch || — || align=right data-sort-value="0.53" | 530 m || 
|-id=375 bgcolor=#d6d6d6
| 423375 ||  || — || May 6, 2005 || Catalina || CSS || Tj (2.99) || align=right | 3.8 km || 
|-id=376 bgcolor=#d6d6d6
| 423376 ||  || — || May 6, 2005 || Kitt Peak || Spacewatch || — || align=right | 4.1 km || 
|-id=377 bgcolor=#d6d6d6
| 423377 ||  || — || May 10, 2005 || Kitt Peak || Spacewatch || — || align=right | 3.4 km || 
|-id=378 bgcolor=#d6d6d6
| 423378 ||  || — || May 8, 2005 || Kitt Peak || Spacewatch || — || align=right | 2.8 km || 
|-id=379 bgcolor=#d6d6d6
| 423379 ||  || — || March 12, 2005 || Mount Lemmon || Mount Lemmon Survey || — || align=right | 2.9 km || 
|-id=380 bgcolor=#fefefe
| 423380 Juhászárpád ||  ||  || May 12, 2005 || Piszkéstető || K. Sárneczky || — || align=right data-sort-value="0.77" | 770 m || 
|-id=381 bgcolor=#d6d6d6
| 423381 ||  || — || May 8, 2005 || Kitt Peak || Spacewatch || EOS || align=right | 2.7 km || 
|-id=382 bgcolor=#d6d6d6
| 423382 ||  || — || May 9, 2005 || Catalina || CSS || — || align=right | 3.7 km || 
|-id=383 bgcolor=#d6d6d6
| 423383 ||  || — || May 9, 2005 || Catalina || CSS || — || align=right | 4.0 km || 
|-id=384 bgcolor=#fefefe
| 423384 ||  || — || May 9, 2005 || Socorro || LINEAR || — || align=right data-sort-value="0.89" | 890 m || 
|-id=385 bgcolor=#d6d6d6
| 423385 ||  || — || May 10, 2005 || Kitt Peak || Spacewatch || — || align=right | 3.6 km || 
|-id=386 bgcolor=#fefefe
| 423386 ||  || — || May 10, 2005 || Kitt Peak || Spacewatch || — || align=right data-sort-value="0.72" | 720 m || 
|-id=387 bgcolor=#d6d6d6
| 423387 ||  || — || May 12, 2005 || Palomar || NEAT || — || align=right | 1.9 km || 
|-id=388 bgcolor=#d6d6d6
| 423388 ||  || — || May 14, 2005 || Mount Lemmon || Mount Lemmon Survey || — || align=right | 3.6 km || 
|-id=389 bgcolor=#d6d6d6
| 423389 ||  || — || May 3, 2005 || Catalina || CSS || — || align=right | 4.1 km || 
|-id=390 bgcolor=#d6d6d6
| 423390 ||  || — || May 4, 2005 || Palomar || NEAT || — || align=right | 3.4 km || 
|-id=391 bgcolor=#d6d6d6
| 423391 ||  || — || May 4, 2005 || Mount Lemmon || Mount Lemmon Survey || — || align=right | 3.4 km || 
|-id=392 bgcolor=#d6d6d6
| 423392 ||  || — || May 6, 2005 || Kitt Peak || Spacewatch || — || align=right | 2.7 km || 
|-id=393 bgcolor=#fefefe
| 423393 ||  || — || May 10, 2005 || Mount Lemmon || Mount Lemmon Survey || — || align=right data-sort-value="0.60" | 600 m || 
|-id=394 bgcolor=#d6d6d6
| 423394 ||  || — || May 16, 2005 || Mount Lemmon || Mount Lemmon Survey || — || align=right | 2.4 km || 
|-id=395 bgcolor=#d6d6d6
| 423395 ||  || — || April 11, 2005 || Kitt Peak || Spacewatch || EOS || align=right | 2.1 km || 
|-id=396 bgcolor=#fefefe
| 423396 ||  || — || May 18, 2005 || Palomar || NEAT || — || align=right | 1.1 km || 
|-id=397 bgcolor=#fefefe
| 423397 ||  || — || May 28, 2005 || Reedy Creek || J. Broughton || — || align=right data-sort-value="0.81" | 810 m || 
|-id=398 bgcolor=#fefefe
| 423398 ||  || — || June 1, 2005 || Kitt Peak || Spacewatch || MAS || align=right data-sort-value="0.73" | 730 m || 
|-id=399 bgcolor=#FA8072
| 423399 ||  || — || June 2, 2005 || Catalina || CSS || — || align=right data-sort-value="0.95" | 950 m || 
|-id=400 bgcolor=#d6d6d6
| 423400 ||  || — || May 13, 2005 || Kitt Peak || Spacewatch || — || align=right | 3.1 km || 
|}

423401–423500 

|-bgcolor=#fefefe
| 423401 ||  || — || June 5, 2005 || Kitt Peak || Spacewatch || — || align=right data-sort-value="0.75" | 750 m || 
|-id=402 bgcolor=#fefefe
| 423402 ||  || — || June 8, 2005 || Kitt Peak || Spacewatch || — || align=right data-sort-value="0.70" | 700 m || 
|-id=403 bgcolor=#fefefe
| 423403 ||  || — || May 16, 2005 || Kitt Peak || Spacewatch || — || align=right data-sort-value="0.75" | 750 m || 
|-id=404 bgcolor=#d6d6d6
| 423404 ||  || — || June 11, 2005 || Kitt Peak || Spacewatch || — || align=right | 3.1 km || 
|-id=405 bgcolor=#d6d6d6
| 423405 ||  || — || June 13, 2005 || Kitt Peak || Spacewatch || — || align=right | 3.4 km || 
|-id=406 bgcolor=#fefefe
| 423406 ||  || — || June 24, 2005 || Palomar || NEAT || — || align=right data-sort-value="0.94" | 940 m || 
|-id=407 bgcolor=#C2FFFF
| 423407 ||  || — || June 4, 2005 || Kitt Peak || Spacewatch || L4 || align=right | 12 km || 
|-id=408 bgcolor=#d6d6d6
| 423408 ||  || — || June 24, 2005 || Palomar || NEAT || — || align=right | 3.9 km || 
|-id=409 bgcolor=#d6d6d6
| 423409 ||  || — || June 24, 2005 || Palomar || NEAT || — || align=right | 3.6 km || 
|-id=410 bgcolor=#fefefe
| 423410 ||  || — || June 27, 2005 || Kitt Peak || Spacewatch || — || align=right | 1.0 km || 
|-id=411 bgcolor=#fefefe
| 423411 ||  || — || June 27, 2005 || Kitt Peak || Spacewatch || — || align=right | 1.2 km || 
|-id=412 bgcolor=#fefefe
| 423412 ||  || — || June 30, 2005 || Palomar || NEAT || — || align=right data-sort-value="0.79" | 790 m || 
|-id=413 bgcolor=#E9E9E9
| 423413 ||  || — || June 20, 2005 || Palomar || NEAT || — || align=right | 2.2 km || 
|-id=414 bgcolor=#fefefe
| 423414 ||  || — || July 2, 2005 || Kitt Peak || Spacewatch || — || align=right data-sort-value="0.83" | 830 m || 
|-id=415 bgcolor=#E9E9E9
| 423415 ||  || — || July 5, 2005 || Mount Lemmon || Mount Lemmon Survey || EUN || align=right data-sort-value="0.88" | 880 m || 
|-id=416 bgcolor=#E9E9E9
| 423416 ||  || — || July 10, 2005 || Kitt Peak || Spacewatch || — || align=right | 1.4 km || 
|-id=417 bgcolor=#fefefe
| 423417 ||  || — || July 4, 2005 || Catalina || CSS || — || align=right | 1.8 km || 
|-id=418 bgcolor=#E9E9E9
| 423418 ||  || — || July 10, 2005 || Kitt Peak || Spacewatch || — || align=right data-sort-value="0.88" | 880 m || 
|-id=419 bgcolor=#fefefe
| 423419 ||  || — || July 28, 2005 || Palomar || NEAT || MAS || align=right data-sort-value="0.81" | 810 m || 
|-id=420 bgcolor=#fefefe
| 423420 ||  || — || July 25, 2005 || Siding Spring || SSS || — || align=right | 1.3 km || 
|-id=421 bgcolor=#d6d6d6
| 423421 ||  || — || August 4, 2005 || Palomar || NEAT || — || align=right | 3.8 km || 
|-id=422 bgcolor=#FA8072
| 423422 ||  || — || August 4, 2005 || Palomar || NEAT || — || align=right data-sort-value="0.81" | 810 m || 
|-id=423 bgcolor=#fefefe
| 423423 ||  || — || August 4, 2005 || Palomar || NEAT || — || align=right data-sort-value="0.99" | 990 m || 
|-id=424 bgcolor=#fefefe
| 423424 ||  || — || August 5, 2005 || Palomar || NEAT || — || align=right data-sort-value="0.94" | 940 m || 
|-id=425 bgcolor=#fefefe
| 423425 ||  || — || August 6, 2005 || Siding Spring || SSS || — || align=right | 2.2 km || 
|-id=426 bgcolor=#d6d6d6
| 423426 ||  || — || August 24, 2005 || Palomar || NEAT || — || align=right | 4.2 km || 
|-id=427 bgcolor=#E9E9E9
| 423427 ||  || — || August 24, 2005 || Palomar || NEAT || — || align=right | 1.0 km || 
|-id=428 bgcolor=#E9E9E9
| 423428 ||  || — || August 27, 2005 || Anderson Mesa || LONEOS || — || align=right | 1.5 km || 
|-id=429 bgcolor=#E9E9E9
| 423429 ||  || — || August 25, 2005 || Palomar || NEAT || — || align=right data-sort-value="0.99" | 990 m || 
|-id=430 bgcolor=#fefefe
| 423430 ||  || — || August 25, 2005 || Palomar || NEAT || H || align=right data-sort-value="0.52" | 520 m || 
|-id=431 bgcolor=#E9E9E9
| 423431 ||  || — || August 29, 2005 || Jarnac || Jarnac Obs. || (5) || align=right data-sort-value="0.81" | 810 m || 
|-id=432 bgcolor=#fefefe
| 423432 ||  || — || August 26, 2005 || Palomar || NEAT || — || align=right data-sort-value="0.88" | 880 m || 
|-id=433 bgcolor=#E9E9E9
| 423433 Harsányi ||  ||  || August 29, 2005 || Piszkéstető || K. Sárneczky, Z. Kuli || — || align=right data-sort-value="0.75" | 750 m || 
|-id=434 bgcolor=#fefefe
| 423434 ||  || — || August 28, 2005 || Kitt Peak || Spacewatch || V || align=right data-sort-value="0.70" | 700 m || 
|-id=435 bgcolor=#E9E9E9
| 423435 ||  || — || August 30, 2005 || Kitt Peak || Spacewatch || — || align=right data-sort-value="0.82" | 820 m || 
|-id=436 bgcolor=#E9E9E9
| 423436 ||  || — || August 30, 2005 || Campo Imperatore || CINEOS || (194) || align=right | 1.2 km || 
|-id=437 bgcolor=#fefefe
| 423437 ||  || — || August 30, 2005 || Kitt Peak || Spacewatch || — || align=right data-sort-value="0.92" | 920 m || 
|-id=438 bgcolor=#fefefe
| 423438 ||  || — || August 31, 2005 || Kitt Peak || Spacewatch || — || align=right | 1.2 km || 
|-id=439 bgcolor=#fefefe
| 423439 ||  || — || September 1, 2005 || Kitt Peak || Spacewatch || NYS || align=right data-sort-value="0.65" | 650 m || 
|-id=440 bgcolor=#E9E9E9
| 423440 ||  || — || September 2, 2005 || Palomar || NEAT || — || align=right | 1.3 km || 
|-id=441 bgcolor=#E9E9E9
| 423441 ||  || — || September 23, 2005 || Kitt Peak || Spacewatch || — || align=right data-sort-value="0.65" | 650 m || 
|-id=442 bgcolor=#E9E9E9
| 423442 ||  || — || September 22, 2005 || Palomar || NEAT || — || align=right | 1.1 km || 
|-id=443 bgcolor=#E9E9E9
| 423443 ||  || — || September 24, 2005 || Kitt Peak || Spacewatch || — || align=right | 1.2 km || 
|-id=444 bgcolor=#E9E9E9
| 423444 ||  || — || September 23, 2005 || Catalina || CSS || — || align=right | 1.0 km || 
|-id=445 bgcolor=#E9E9E9
| 423445 ||  || — || September 24, 2005 || Kitt Peak || Spacewatch || — || align=right data-sort-value="0.86" | 860 m || 
|-id=446 bgcolor=#fefefe
| 423446 ||  || — || September 24, 2005 || Kitt Peak || Spacewatch || — || align=right data-sort-value="0.88" | 880 m || 
|-id=447 bgcolor=#E9E9E9
| 423447 ||  || — || September 27, 2005 || Kitt Peak || Spacewatch || ADE || align=right | 2.0 km || 
|-id=448 bgcolor=#E9E9E9
| 423448 ||  || — || September 18, 2005 || Palomar || NEAT || JUN || align=right | 1.2 km || 
|-id=449 bgcolor=#E9E9E9
| 423449 ||  || — || September 24, 2005 || Kitt Peak || Spacewatch || — || align=right | 1.1 km || 
|-id=450 bgcolor=#E9E9E9
| 423450 ||  || — || September 24, 2005 || Kitt Peak || Spacewatch || — || align=right | 1.1 km || 
|-id=451 bgcolor=#E9E9E9
| 423451 ||  || — || September 24, 2005 || Kitt Peak || Spacewatch || — || align=right data-sort-value="0.88" | 880 m || 
|-id=452 bgcolor=#E9E9E9
| 423452 ||  || — || September 25, 2005 || Palomar || NEAT || — || align=right data-sort-value="0.91" | 910 m || 
|-id=453 bgcolor=#fefefe
| 423453 ||  || — || September 25, 2005 || Kitt Peak || Spacewatch || — || align=right data-sort-value="0.97" | 970 m || 
|-id=454 bgcolor=#fefefe
| 423454 ||  || — || September 26, 2005 || Kitt Peak || Spacewatch || MAS || align=right data-sort-value="0.70" | 700 m || 
|-id=455 bgcolor=#E9E9E9
| 423455 ||  || — || September 26, 2005 || Kitt Peak || Spacewatch || (5) || align=right data-sort-value="0.57" | 570 m || 
|-id=456 bgcolor=#E9E9E9
| 423456 ||  || — || September 26, 2005 || Catalina || CSS || — || align=right | 1.6 km || 
|-id=457 bgcolor=#E9E9E9
| 423457 ||  || — || September 27, 2005 || Kitt Peak || Spacewatch || — || align=right data-sort-value="0.61" | 610 m || 
|-id=458 bgcolor=#fefefe
| 423458 ||  || — || September 29, 2005 || Mount Lemmon || Mount Lemmon Survey || — || align=right data-sort-value="0.86" | 860 m || 
|-id=459 bgcolor=#E9E9E9
| 423459 ||  || — || September 29, 2005 || Kitt Peak || Spacewatch || — || align=right | 1.2 km || 
|-id=460 bgcolor=#E9E9E9
| 423460 ||  || — || September 29, 2005 || Great Shefford || P. Birtwhistle || — || align=right data-sort-value="0.91" | 910 m || 
|-id=461 bgcolor=#fefefe
| 423461 ||  || — || September 25, 2005 || Kitt Peak || Spacewatch || — || align=right data-sort-value="0.87" | 870 m || 
|-id=462 bgcolor=#fefefe
| 423462 ||  || — || September 25, 2005 || Kitt Peak || Spacewatch || V || align=right data-sort-value="0.62" | 620 m || 
|-id=463 bgcolor=#fefefe
| 423463 ||  || — || September 25, 2005 || Kitt Peak || Spacewatch || — || align=right data-sort-value="0.88" | 880 m || 
|-id=464 bgcolor=#E9E9E9
| 423464 ||  || — || September 27, 2005 || Kitt Peak || Spacewatch || ADE || align=right | 1.9 km || 
|-id=465 bgcolor=#E9E9E9
| 423465 ||  || — || September 14, 2005 || Kitt Peak || Spacewatch || EUN || align=right | 1.2 km || 
|-id=466 bgcolor=#E9E9E9
| 423466 ||  || — || September 29, 2005 || Kitt Peak || Spacewatch || — || align=right | 1.3 km || 
|-id=467 bgcolor=#E9E9E9
| 423467 ||  || — || September 24, 2005 || Kitt Peak || Spacewatch || — || align=right | 1.2 km || 
|-id=468 bgcolor=#E9E9E9
| 423468 ||  || — || September 29, 2005 || Kitt Peak || Spacewatch || — || align=right | 1.3 km || 
|-id=469 bgcolor=#fefefe
| 423469 ||  || — || September 30, 2005 || Kitt Peak || Spacewatch || — || align=right data-sort-value="0.86" | 860 m || 
|-id=470 bgcolor=#E9E9E9
| 423470 ||  || — || September 30, 2005 || Catalina || CSS || — || align=right | 1.4 km || 
|-id=471 bgcolor=#E9E9E9
| 423471 ||  || — || September 30, 2005 || Anderson Mesa || LONEOS || — || align=right | 1.8 km || 
|-id=472 bgcolor=#fefefe
| 423472 ||  || — || September 29, 2005 || Mount Lemmon || Mount Lemmon Survey || — || align=right data-sort-value="0.94" | 940 m || 
|-id=473 bgcolor=#E9E9E9
| 423473 ||  || — || September 29, 2005 || Kitt Peak || Spacewatch || — || align=right | 1.8 km || 
|-id=474 bgcolor=#E9E9E9
| 423474 ||  || — || September 30, 2005 || Palomar || NEAT || — || align=right | 2.3 km || 
|-id=475 bgcolor=#E9E9E9
| 423475 ||  || — || September 30, 2005 || Mount Lemmon || Mount Lemmon Survey || — || align=right | 1.0 km || 
|-id=476 bgcolor=#E9E9E9
| 423476 ||  || — || September 23, 2005 || Catalina || CSS || — || align=right | 1.3 km || 
|-id=477 bgcolor=#fefefe
| 423477 ||  || — || September 30, 2005 || Mount Lemmon || Mount Lemmon Survey || — || align=right data-sort-value="0.90" | 900 m || 
|-id=478 bgcolor=#fefefe
| 423478 ||  || — || September 27, 2005 || Kitt Peak || Spacewatch || — || align=right data-sort-value="0.76" | 760 m || 
|-id=479 bgcolor=#E9E9E9
| 423479 ||  || — || September 23, 2005 || Catalina || CSS || — || align=right | 1.1 km || 
|-id=480 bgcolor=#E9E9E9
| 423480 ||  || — || October 1, 2005 || Catalina || CSS || (5) || align=right data-sort-value="0.61" | 610 m || 
|-id=481 bgcolor=#E9E9E9
| 423481 ||  || — || October 1, 2005 || Kitt Peak || Spacewatch || EUN || align=right data-sort-value="0.99" | 990 m || 
|-id=482 bgcolor=#E9E9E9
| 423482 ||  || — || October 2, 2005 || Anderson Mesa || LONEOS || — || align=right | 1.9 km || 
|-id=483 bgcolor=#E9E9E9
| 423483 ||  || — || October 1, 2005 || Kitt Peak || Spacewatch || — || align=right data-sort-value="0.70" | 700 m || 
|-id=484 bgcolor=#d6d6d6
| 423484 ||  || — || October 1, 2005 || Kitt Peak || Spacewatch || 3:2 || align=right | 3.5 km || 
|-id=485 bgcolor=#E9E9E9
| 423485 ||  || — || October 1, 2005 || Socorro || LINEAR || — || align=right | 1.5 km || 
|-id=486 bgcolor=#E9E9E9
| 423486 ||  || — || October 1, 2005 || Mount Lemmon || Mount Lemmon Survey || critical || align=right | 1.0 km || 
|-id=487 bgcolor=#FA8072
| 423487 ||  || — || October 6, 2005 || Anderson Mesa || LONEOS || — || align=right data-sort-value="0.65" | 650 m || 
|-id=488 bgcolor=#E9E9E9
| 423488 ||  || — || October 1, 2005 || Mount Lemmon || Mount Lemmon Survey || — || align=right | 1.1 km || 
|-id=489 bgcolor=#fefefe
| 423489 ||  || — || October 3, 2005 || Kitt Peak || Spacewatch || — || align=right data-sort-value="0.91" | 910 m || 
|-id=490 bgcolor=#fefefe
| 423490 ||  || — || October 7, 2005 || Mount Lemmon || Mount Lemmon Survey || NYS || align=right data-sort-value="0.71" | 710 m || 
|-id=491 bgcolor=#E9E9E9
| 423491 ||  || — || October 3, 2005 || Kitt Peak || Spacewatch || EUN || align=right | 1.0 km || 
|-id=492 bgcolor=#E9E9E9
| 423492 ||  || — || October 7, 2005 || Kitt Peak || Spacewatch || — || align=right | 1.7 km || 
|-id=493 bgcolor=#E9E9E9
| 423493 ||  || — || October 7, 2005 || Kitt Peak || Spacewatch || — || align=right data-sort-value="0.75" | 750 m || 
|-id=494 bgcolor=#E9E9E9
| 423494 ||  || — || September 27, 2005 || Kitt Peak || Spacewatch || — || align=right | 1.3 km || 
|-id=495 bgcolor=#E9E9E9
| 423495 ||  || — || September 27, 2005 || Kitt Peak || Spacewatch || — || align=right | 1.4 km || 
|-id=496 bgcolor=#E9E9E9
| 423496 ||  || — || October 7, 2005 || Kitt Peak || Spacewatch || — || align=right data-sort-value="0.91" | 910 m || 
|-id=497 bgcolor=#E9E9E9
| 423497 ||  || — || October 7, 2005 || Kitt Peak || Spacewatch || — || align=right | 1.2 km || 
|-id=498 bgcolor=#E9E9E9
| 423498 ||  || — || October 7, 2005 || Kitt Peak || Spacewatch || — || align=right | 1.9 km || 
|-id=499 bgcolor=#E9E9E9
| 423499 ||  || — || September 23, 2005 || Kitt Peak || Spacewatch || — || align=right data-sort-value="0.86" | 860 m || 
|-id=500 bgcolor=#E9E9E9
| 423500 ||  || — || October 8, 2005 || Kitt Peak || Spacewatch || — || align=right data-sort-value="0.69" | 690 m || 
|}

423501–423600 

|-bgcolor=#E9E9E9
| 423501 ||  || — || October 8, 2005 || Kitt Peak || Spacewatch || — || align=right data-sort-value="0.66" | 660 m || 
|-id=502 bgcolor=#E9E9E9
| 423502 ||  || — || October 9, 2005 || Kitt Peak || Spacewatch || — || align=right data-sort-value="0.67" | 670 m || 
|-id=503 bgcolor=#fefefe
| 423503 ||  || — || October 9, 2005 || Kitt Peak || Spacewatch || — || align=right data-sort-value="0.73" | 730 m || 
|-id=504 bgcolor=#E9E9E9
| 423504 ||  || — || October 1, 2005 || Anderson Mesa || LONEOS || — || align=right | 1.2 km || 
|-id=505 bgcolor=#E9E9E9
| 423505 ||  || — || October 7, 2005 || Kitt Peak || Spacewatch || — || align=right | 1.0 km || 
|-id=506 bgcolor=#E9E9E9
| 423506 ||  || — || October 13, 2005 || Kitt Peak || Spacewatch || — || align=right | 1.0 km || 
|-id=507 bgcolor=#fefefe
| 423507 ||  || — || October 1, 2005 || Mount Lemmon || Mount Lemmon Survey || — || align=right data-sort-value="0.76" | 760 m || 
|-id=508 bgcolor=#E9E9E9
| 423508 ||  || — || October 11, 2005 || Kitt Peak || Spacewatch || — || align=right | 1.2 km || 
|-id=509 bgcolor=#E9E9E9
| 423509 ||  || — || October 22, 2005 || Kitt Peak || Spacewatch || — || align=right | 1.3 km || 
|-id=510 bgcolor=#E9E9E9
| 423510 ||  || — || October 22, 2005 || Kitt Peak || Spacewatch || (194) || align=right | 2.5 km || 
|-id=511 bgcolor=#E9E9E9
| 423511 ||  || — || October 23, 2005 || Kitt Peak || Spacewatch || (5) || align=right | 1.7 km || 
|-id=512 bgcolor=#E9E9E9
| 423512 ||  || — || October 22, 2005 || Kitt Peak || Spacewatch || — || align=right | 1.1 km || 
|-id=513 bgcolor=#E9E9E9
| 423513 ||  || — || October 23, 2005 || Catalina || CSS || — || align=right data-sort-value="0.98" | 980 m || 
|-id=514 bgcolor=#E9E9E9
| 423514 ||  || — || October 23, 2005 || Catalina || CSS || — || align=right | 1.8 km || 
|-id=515 bgcolor=#E9E9E9
| 423515 ||  || — || October 24, 2005 || Kitt Peak || Spacewatch || MIS || align=right | 2.3 km || 
|-id=516 bgcolor=#E9E9E9
| 423516 ||  || — || October 25, 2005 || Mount Lemmon || Mount Lemmon Survey || — || align=right | 1.1 km || 
|-id=517 bgcolor=#E9E9E9
| 423517 ||  || — || October 25, 2005 || Catalina || CSS || — || align=right | 1.1 km || 
|-id=518 bgcolor=#E9E9E9
| 423518 ||  || — || October 22, 2005 || Palomar || NEAT || — || align=right | 1.9 km || 
|-id=519 bgcolor=#E9E9E9
| 423519 ||  || — || October 23, 2005 || Catalina || CSS || — || align=right data-sort-value="0.83" | 830 m || 
|-id=520 bgcolor=#E9E9E9
| 423520 ||  || — || October 23, 2005 || Palomar || NEAT || ADE || align=right | 2.2 km || 
|-id=521 bgcolor=#E9E9E9
| 423521 ||  || — || October 22, 2005 || Kitt Peak || Spacewatch || — || align=right | 1.2 km || 
|-id=522 bgcolor=#E9E9E9
| 423522 ||  || — || October 22, 2005 || Kitt Peak || Spacewatch || — || align=right | 1.2 km || 
|-id=523 bgcolor=#E9E9E9
| 423523 ||  || — || October 22, 2005 || Kitt Peak || Spacewatch || — || align=right | 1.2 km || 
|-id=524 bgcolor=#E9E9E9
| 423524 ||  || — || October 22, 2005 || Kitt Peak || Spacewatch || — || align=right | 2.0 km || 
|-id=525 bgcolor=#E9E9E9
| 423525 ||  || — || October 22, 2005 || Kitt Peak || Spacewatch || — || align=right | 2.2 km || 
|-id=526 bgcolor=#E9E9E9
| 423526 ||  || — || October 24, 2005 || Kitt Peak || Spacewatch || — || align=right data-sort-value="0.91" | 910 m || 
|-id=527 bgcolor=#E9E9E9
| 423527 ||  || — || October 24, 2005 || Kitt Peak || Spacewatch || (5) || align=right data-sort-value="0.76" | 760 m || 
|-id=528 bgcolor=#E9E9E9
| 423528 ||  || — || October 25, 2005 || Kitt Peak || Spacewatch || — || align=right | 1.1 km || 
|-id=529 bgcolor=#E9E9E9
| 423529 ||  || — || October 25, 2005 || Kitt Peak || Spacewatch || ADE || align=right | 3.2 km || 
|-id=530 bgcolor=#E9E9E9
| 423530 ||  || — || October 26, 2005 || Kitt Peak || Spacewatch || — || align=right | 1.6 km || 
|-id=531 bgcolor=#fefefe
| 423531 ||  || — || October 31, 2005 || Junk Bond || D. Healy || NYS || align=right data-sort-value="0.71" | 710 m || 
|-id=532 bgcolor=#E9E9E9
| 423532 ||  || — || October 24, 2005 || Kitt Peak || Spacewatch || MIS || align=right | 1.8 km || 
|-id=533 bgcolor=#E9E9E9
| 423533 ||  || — || October 24, 2005 || Kitt Peak || Spacewatch || — || align=right | 1.3 km || 
|-id=534 bgcolor=#E9E9E9
| 423534 ||  || — || October 24, 2005 || Kitt Peak || Spacewatch || — || align=right | 1.6 km || 
|-id=535 bgcolor=#E9E9E9
| 423535 ||  || — || October 24, 2005 || Kitt Peak || Spacewatch || — || align=right data-sort-value="0.85" | 850 m || 
|-id=536 bgcolor=#E9E9E9
| 423536 ||  || — || October 22, 2005 || Kitt Peak || Spacewatch || — || align=right data-sort-value="0.67" | 670 m || 
|-id=537 bgcolor=#E9E9E9
| 423537 ||  || — || October 1, 2005 || Kitt Peak || Spacewatch || — || align=right | 1.6 km || 
|-id=538 bgcolor=#E9E9E9
| 423538 ||  || — || October 26, 2005 || Kitt Peak || Spacewatch || — || align=right | 1.2 km || 
|-id=539 bgcolor=#E9E9E9
| 423539 ||  || — || October 27, 2005 || Kitt Peak || Spacewatch || — || align=right | 1.3 km || 
|-id=540 bgcolor=#E9E9E9
| 423540 ||  || — || October 25, 2005 || Kitt Peak || Spacewatch || — || align=right | 1.0 km || 
|-id=541 bgcolor=#E9E9E9
| 423541 ||  || — || October 25, 2005 || Kitt Peak || Spacewatch || — || align=right | 1.8 km || 
|-id=542 bgcolor=#E9E9E9
| 423542 ||  || — || October 25, 2005 || Kitt Peak || Spacewatch || — || align=right | 1.3 km || 
|-id=543 bgcolor=#E9E9E9
| 423543 ||  || — || October 25, 2005 || Kitt Peak || Spacewatch || ADE || align=right | 2.4 km || 
|-id=544 bgcolor=#E9E9E9
| 423544 ||  || — || October 28, 2005 || Mount Lemmon || Mount Lemmon Survey || EUN || align=right | 1.1 km || 
|-id=545 bgcolor=#E9E9E9
| 423545 ||  || — || October 27, 2005 || Kitt Peak || Spacewatch || — || align=right | 1.2 km || 
|-id=546 bgcolor=#E9E9E9
| 423546 ||  || — || October 23, 2005 || Catalina || CSS || — || align=right | 1.9 km || 
|-id=547 bgcolor=#E9E9E9
| 423547 ||  || — || October 24, 2005 || Kitt Peak || Spacewatch || — || align=right data-sort-value="0.69" | 690 m || 
|-id=548 bgcolor=#E9E9E9
| 423548 ||  || — || October 25, 2005 || Mount Lemmon || Mount Lemmon Survey || — || align=right | 1.5 km || 
|-id=549 bgcolor=#E9E9E9
| 423549 ||  || — || October 26, 2005 || Kitt Peak || Spacewatch || — || align=right data-sort-value="0.87" | 870 m || 
|-id=550 bgcolor=#E9E9E9
| 423550 ||  || — || October 26, 2005 || Kitt Peak || Spacewatch || — || align=right | 1.3 km || 
|-id=551 bgcolor=#E9E9E9
| 423551 ||  || — || October 28, 2005 || Mount Lemmon || Mount Lemmon Survey || — || align=right | 1.7 km || 
|-id=552 bgcolor=#E9E9E9
| 423552 ||  || — || October 29, 2005 || Catalina || CSS || EUN || align=right | 1.2 km || 
|-id=553 bgcolor=#E9E9E9
| 423553 ||  || — || October 28, 2005 || Catalina || CSS || EUN || align=right | 1.2 km || 
|-id=554 bgcolor=#E9E9E9
| 423554 ||  || — || October 28, 2005 || Kitt Peak || Spacewatch || — || align=right | 1.7 km || 
|-id=555 bgcolor=#E9E9E9
| 423555 ||  || — || October 29, 2005 || Catalina || CSS || — || align=right | 1.6 km || 
|-id=556 bgcolor=#E9E9E9
| 423556 ||  || — || October 29, 2005 || Catalina || CSS || — || align=right | 2.9 km || 
|-id=557 bgcolor=#E9E9E9
| 423557 ||  || — || October 29, 2005 || Catalina || CSS || — || align=right | 1.8 km || 
|-id=558 bgcolor=#E9E9E9
| 423558 ||  || — || October 29, 2005 || Catalina || CSS || EUN || align=right | 1.4 km || 
|-id=559 bgcolor=#E9E9E9
| 423559 ||  || — || October 31, 2005 || Mount Lemmon || Mount Lemmon Survey || — || align=right | 1.3 km || 
|-id=560 bgcolor=#E9E9E9
| 423560 ||  || — || October 29, 2005 || Mount Lemmon || Mount Lemmon Survey || KON || align=right | 3.1 km || 
|-id=561 bgcolor=#E9E9E9
| 423561 ||  || — || October 27, 2005 || Mount Lemmon || Mount Lemmon Survey || — || align=right | 1.7 km || 
|-id=562 bgcolor=#E9E9E9
| 423562 ||  || — || October 28, 2005 || Kitt Peak || Spacewatch || — || align=right | 1.3 km || 
|-id=563 bgcolor=#E9E9E9
| 423563 ||  || — || October 29, 2005 || Palomar || NEAT || — || align=right | 1.5 km || 
|-id=564 bgcolor=#E9E9E9
| 423564 ||  || — || October 7, 2005 || Anderson Mesa || LONEOS || — || align=right | 1.9 km || 
|-id=565 bgcolor=#E9E9E9
| 423565 ||  || — || October 30, 2005 || Kitt Peak || Spacewatch || — || align=right | 1.1 km || 
|-id=566 bgcolor=#E9E9E9
| 423566 ||  || — || October 22, 2005 || Palomar || NEAT || — || align=right | 1.2 km || 
|-id=567 bgcolor=#E9E9E9
| 423567 ||  || — || October 25, 2005 || Catalina || CSS || JUN || align=right | 1.1 km || 
|-id=568 bgcolor=#E9E9E9
| 423568 ||  || — || July 6, 2005 || Kitt Peak || Spacewatch || — || align=right | 1.6 km || 
|-id=569 bgcolor=#E9E9E9
| 423569 ||  || — || October 26, 2005 || Kitt Peak || Spacewatch || — || align=right | 1.2 km || 
|-id=570 bgcolor=#E9E9E9
| 423570 ||  || — || October 27, 2005 || Kitt Peak || Spacewatch || — || align=right | 1.1 km || 
|-id=571 bgcolor=#E9E9E9
| 423571 ||  || — || October 27, 2005 || Mount Lemmon || Mount Lemmon Survey || — || align=right | 1.3 km || 
|-id=572 bgcolor=#E9E9E9
| 423572 ||  || — || November 6, 2005 || Kitt Peak || Spacewatch || — || align=right | 1.9 km || 
|-id=573 bgcolor=#E9E9E9
| 423573 ||  || — || October 27, 2005 || Kitt Peak || Spacewatch || (5) || align=right data-sort-value="0.64" | 640 m || 
|-id=574 bgcolor=#E9E9E9
| 423574 ||  || — || September 30, 2005 || Mount Lemmon || Mount Lemmon Survey || — || align=right | 1.4 km || 
|-id=575 bgcolor=#E9E9E9
| 423575 ||  || — || October 27, 2005 || Mount Lemmon || Mount Lemmon Survey || — || align=right | 1.1 km || 
|-id=576 bgcolor=#E9E9E9
| 423576 ||  || — || November 3, 2005 || Catalina || CSS || — || align=right data-sort-value="0.93" | 930 m || 
|-id=577 bgcolor=#E9E9E9
| 423577 ||  || — || November 3, 2005 || Kitt Peak || Spacewatch || — || align=right | 1.3 km || 
|-id=578 bgcolor=#E9E9E9
| 423578 ||  || — || November 1, 2005 || Mount Lemmon || Mount Lemmon Survey || — || align=right | 1.2 km || 
|-id=579 bgcolor=#E9E9E9
| 423579 ||  || — || September 14, 2005 || Catalina || CSS || — || align=right | 1.3 km || 
|-id=580 bgcolor=#E9E9E9
| 423580 ||  || — || October 27, 2005 || Anderson Mesa || LONEOS || — || align=right | 2.4 km || 
|-id=581 bgcolor=#E9E9E9
| 423581 ||  || — || October 29, 2005 || Kitt Peak || Spacewatch || — || align=right | 1.4 km || 
|-id=582 bgcolor=#E9E9E9
| 423582 ||  || — || November 6, 2005 || Mount Lemmon || Mount Lemmon Survey || — || align=right data-sort-value="0.98" | 980 m || 
|-id=583 bgcolor=#E9E9E9
| 423583 ||  || — || November 6, 2005 || Mount Lemmon || Mount Lemmon Survey || (1547) || align=right | 1.6 km || 
|-id=584 bgcolor=#E9E9E9
| 423584 ||  || — || November 5, 2005 || Kitt Peak || Spacewatch || — || align=right | 1.9 km || 
|-id=585 bgcolor=#d6d6d6
| 423585 ||  || — || November 5, 2005 || Kitt Peak || Spacewatch || 3:2 || align=right | 4.3 km || 
|-id=586 bgcolor=#E9E9E9
| 423586 ||  || — || November 1, 2005 || Anderson Mesa || LONEOS || MAR || align=right | 1.3 km || 
|-id=587 bgcolor=#E9E9E9
| 423587 ||  || — || November 5, 2005 || Kitt Peak || Spacewatch || — || align=right | 1.1 km || 
|-id=588 bgcolor=#E9E9E9
| 423588 ||  || — || October 25, 2005 || Kitt Peak || Spacewatch || — || align=right | 2.2 km || 
|-id=589 bgcolor=#E9E9E9
| 423589 ||  || — || November 6, 2005 || Mount Lemmon || Mount Lemmon Survey || — || align=right | 1.5 km || 
|-id=590 bgcolor=#d6d6d6
| 423590 ||  || — || November 6, 2005 || Kitt Peak || Spacewatch || — || align=right | 2.7 km || 
|-id=591 bgcolor=#E9E9E9
| 423591 ||  || — || October 25, 2005 || Kitt Peak || Spacewatch || — || align=right | 2.1 km || 
|-id=592 bgcolor=#E9E9E9
| 423592 ||  || — || November 10, 2005 || Kitt Peak || Spacewatch || — || align=right | 1.9 km || 
|-id=593 bgcolor=#E9E9E9
| 423593 ||  || — || November 3, 2005 || Kitt Peak || Spacewatch || — || align=right | 1.1 km || 
|-id=594 bgcolor=#E9E9E9
| 423594 ||  || — || November 5, 2005 || Mount Lemmon || Mount Lemmon Survey || — || align=right | 1.3 km || 
|-id=595 bgcolor=#E9E9E9
| 423595 ||  || — || November 21, 2005 || Catalina || CSS || — || align=right | 1.3 km || 
|-id=596 bgcolor=#E9E9E9
| 423596 ||  || — || November 18, 2005 || Palomar || NEAT || — || align=right | 1.8 km || 
|-id=597 bgcolor=#E9E9E9
| 423597 ||  || — || November 22, 2005 || Kitt Peak || Spacewatch || — || align=right | 1.3 km || 
|-id=598 bgcolor=#E9E9E9
| 423598 ||  || — || November 21, 2005 || Kitt Peak || Spacewatch || — || align=right | 1.4 km || 
|-id=599 bgcolor=#E9E9E9
| 423599 ||  || — || November 21, 2005 || Kitt Peak || Spacewatch || — || align=right | 2.2 km || 
|-id=600 bgcolor=#E9E9E9
| 423600 ||  || — || November 21, 2005 || Kitt Peak || Spacewatch || — || align=right | 1.4 km || 
|}

423601–423700 

|-bgcolor=#d6d6d6
| 423601 ||  || — || November 21, 2005 || Kitt Peak || Spacewatch || SHU3:2 || align=right | 5.0 km || 
|-id=602 bgcolor=#E9E9E9
| 423602 ||  || — || November 21, 2005 || Kitt Peak || Spacewatch || — || align=right | 1.7 km || 
|-id=603 bgcolor=#E9E9E9
| 423603 ||  || — || November 21, 2005 || Kitt Peak || Spacewatch || ADE || align=right | 2.4 km || 
|-id=604 bgcolor=#E9E9E9
| 423604 ||  || — || November 21, 2005 || Kitt Peak || Spacewatch || — || align=right | 2.3 km || 
|-id=605 bgcolor=#E9E9E9
| 423605 ||  || — || November 21, 2005 || Kitt Peak || Spacewatch || — || align=right | 1.0 km || 
|-id=606 bgcolor=#E9E9E9
| 423606 ||  || — || November 21, 2005 || Kitt Peak || Spacewatch || — || align=right | 1.1 km || 
|-id=607 bgcolor=#E9E9E9
| 423607 ||  || — || November 21, 2005 || Kitt Peak || Spacewatch || EUN || align=right data-sort-value="0.95" | 950 m || 
|-id=608 bgcolor=#E9E9E9
| 423608 ||  || — || November 21, 2005 || Kitt Peak || Spacewatch || — || align=right | 1.6 km || 
|-id=609 bgcolor=#E9E9E9
| 423609 ||  || — || November 25, 2005 || Kitt Peak || Spacewatch || — || align=right | 1.1 km || 
|-id=610 bgcolor=#E9E9E9
| 423610 ||  || — || November 26, 2005 || Catalina || CSS || — || align=right | 1.5 km || 
|-id=611 bgcolor=#E9E9E9
| 423611 ||  || — || November 25, 2005 || Mount Lemmon || Mount Lemmon Survey || — || align=right | 1.7 km || 
|-id=612 bgcolor=#E9E9E9
| 423612 ||  || — || November 25, 2005 || Kitt Peak || Spacewatch || — || align=right | 1.7 km || 
|-id=613 bgcolor=#E9E9E9
| 423613 ||  || — || November 28, 2005 || Mount Lemmon || Mount Lemmon Survey || — || align=right | 1.4 km || 
|-id=614 bgcolor=#E9E9E9
| 423614 ||  || — || November 26, 2005 || Kitt Peak || Spacewatch || — || align=right | 1.4 km || 
|-id=615 bgcolor=#E9E9E9
| 423615 ||  || — || November 28, 2005 || Catalina || CSS || — || align=right | 1.3 km || 
|-id=616 bgcolor=#E9E9E9
| 423616 ||  || — || November 25, 2005 || Kitt Peak || Spacewatch || — || align=right | 1.1 km || 
|-id=617 bgcolor=#E9E9E9
| 423617 ||  || — || November 25, 2005 || Mount Lemmon || Mount Lemmon Survey || (5) || align=right data-sort-value="0.89" | 890 m || 
|-id=618 bgcolor=#E9E9E9
| 423618 ||  || — || November 26, 2005 || Mount Lemmon || Mount Lemmon Survey || — || align=right | 1.8 km || 
|-id=619 bgcolor=#E9E9E9
| 423619 ||  || — || November 26, 2005 || Mount Lemmon || Mount Lemmon Survey || — || align=right | 2.4 km || 
|-id=620 bgcolor=#E9E9E9
| 423620 ||  || — || November 28, 2005 || Mount Lemmon || Mount Lemmon Survey || — || align=right | 3.0 km || 
|-id=621 bgcolor=#E9E9E9
| 423621 ||  || — || November 29, 2005 || Kitt Peak || Spacewatch || — || align=right | 1.5 km || 
|-id=622 bgcolor=#E9E9E9
| 423622 ||  || — || November 22, 2005 || Kitt Peak || Spacewatch || GEF || align=right | 1.5 km || 
|-id=623 bgcolor=#E9E9E9
| 423623 ||  || — || November 29, 2005 || Palomar || NEAT || — || align=right | 1.9 km || 
|-id=624 bgcolor=#E9E9E9
| 423624 ||  || — || November 27, 2005 || Mérida || I. R. Ferrín || — || align=right | 1.6 km || 
|-id=625 bgcolor=#E9E9E9
| 423625 ||  || — || November 29, 2005 || Mount Lemmon || Mount Lemmon Survey || — || align=right | 1.4 km || 
|-id=626 bgcolor=#E9E9E9
| 423626 ||  || — || November 30, 2005 || Kitt Peak || Spacewatch || — || align=right | 1.3 km || 
|-id=627 bgcolor=#E9E9E9
| 423627 ||  || — || November 30, 2005 || Mount Lemmon || Mount Lemmon Survey || — || align=right | 1.1 km || 
|-id=628 bgcolor=#E9E9E9
| 423628 ||  || — || November 30, 2005 || Mount Lemmon || Mount Lemmon Survey || — || align=right | 1.9 km || 
|-id=629 bgcolor=#E9E9E9
| 423629 ||  || — || November 30, 2005 || Kitt Peak || Spacewatch || MIS || align=right | 2.2 km || 
|-id=630 bgcolor=#E9E9E9
| 423630 ||  || — || November 21, 2005 || Catalina || CSS || EUN || align=right | 1.3 km || 
|-id=631 bgcolor=#E9E9E9
| 423631 ||  || — || October 30, 2005 || Mount Lemmon || Mount Lemmon Survey || MRX || align=right | 1.0 km || 
|-id=632 bgcolor=#E9E9E9
| 423632 ||  || — || October 25, 2005 || Mount Lemmon || Mount Lemmon Survey || — || align=right | 1.4 km || 
|-id=633 bgcolor=#E9E9E9
| 423633 ||  || — || November 29, 2005 || Kitt Peak || Spacewatch || — || align=right | 1.2 km || 
|-id=634 bgcolor=#E9E9E9
| 423634 ||  || — || November 30, 2005 || Kitt Peak || Spacewatch || — || align=right | 2.2 km || 
|-id=635 bgcolor=#E9E9E9
| 423635 ||  || — || November 20, 2005 || Palomar || NEAT || — || align=right | 1.9 km || 
|-id=636 bgcolor=#E9E9E9
| 423636 ||  || — || November 25, 2005 || Kitt Peak || Spacewatch || — || align=right | 1.5 km || 
|-id=637 bgcolor=#E9E9E9
| 423637 || 2005 XP || — || December 1, 2005 || Mayhill || iTelescope Obs. || — || align=right | 1.4 km || 
|-id=638 bgcolor=#E9E9E9
| 423638 ||  || — || December 1, 2005 || Kitt Peak || Spacewatch || — || align=right | 1.2 km || 
|-id=639 bgcolor=#E9E9E9
| 423639 ||  || — || December 1, 2005 || Mount Lemmon || Mount Lemmon Survey || — || align=right | 2.1 km || 
|-id=640 bgcolor=#E9E9E9
| 423640 ||  || — || December 2, 2005 || Kitt Peak || Spacewatch || — || align=right | 1.6 km || 
|-id=641 bgcolor=#E9E9E9
| 423641 ||  || — || December 4, 2005 || Socorro || LINEAR || — || align=right | 1.3 km || 
|-id=642 bgcolor=#E9E9E9
| 423642 ||  || — || December 1, 2005 || Palomar || NEAT || — || align=right | 1.1 km || 
|-id=643 bgcolor=#E9E9E9
| 423643 ||  || — || December 5, 2005 || Mount Lemmon || Mount Lemmon Survey || — || align=right | 1.1 km || 
|-id=644 bgcolor=#E9E9E9
| 423644 ||  || — || December 3, 2005 || Kitt Peak || Spacewatch || — || align=right data-sort-value="0.98" | 980 m || 
|-id=645 bgcolor=#E9E9E9
| 423645 Quénisset ||  ||  || December 22, 2005 || Nogales || J.-C. Merlin || MRX || align=right data-sort-value="0.77" | 770 m || 
|-id=646 bgcolor=#E9E9E9
| 423646 ||  || — || December 21, 2005 || Kitt Peak || Spacewatch || — || align=right | 1.1 km || 
|-id=647 bgcolor=#E9E9E9
| 423647 ||  || — || December 23, 2005 || Palomar || NEAT || (1547) || align=right | 1.6 km || 
|-id=648 bgcolor=#E9E9E9
| 423648 ||  || — || December 21, 2005 || Kitt Peak || Spacewatch || — || align=right | 1.3 km || 
|-id=649 bgcolor=#E9E9E9
| 423649 ||  || — || December 22, 2005 || Kitt Peak || Spacewatch || — || align=right | 1.6 km || 
|-id=650 bgcolor=#E9E9E9
| 423650 ||  || — || November 28, 2005 || Mount Lemmon || Mount Lemmon Survey || — || align=right | 2.8 km || 
|-id=651 bgcolor=#E9E9E9
| 423651 ||  || — || December 22, 2005 || Kitt Peak || Spacewatch || — || align=right | 1.8 km || 
|-id=652 bgcolor=#E9E9E9
| 423652 ||  || — || December 24, 2005 || Kitt Peak || Spacewatch || — || align=right | 1.4 km || 
|-id=653 bgcolor=#E9E9E9
| 423653 ||  || — || December 22, 2005 || Kitt Peak || Spacewatch || — || align=right | 1.8 km || 
|-id=654 bgcolor=#E9E9E9
| 423654 ||  || — || December 26, 2005 || Kitt Peak || Spacewatch || — || align=right | 1.9 km || 
|-id=655 bgcolor=#E9E9E9
| 423655 ||  || — || December 8, 2005 || Kitt Peak || Spacewatch || — || align=right | 1.5 km || 
|-id=656 bgcolor=#E9E9E9
| 423656 ||  || — || December 24, 2005 || Kitt Peak || Spacewatch || — || align=right | 1.5 km || 
|-id=657 bgcolor=#E9E9E9
| 423657 ||  || — || December 24, 2005 || Kitt Peak || Spacewatch || — || align=right | 2.7 km || 
|-id=658 bgcolor=#E9E9E9
| 423658 ||  || — || December 25, 2005 || Mount Lemmon || Mount Lemmon Survey || MIS || align=right | 2.7 km || 
|-id=659 bgcolor=#E9E9E9
| 423659 ||  || — || December 25, 2005 || Kitt Peak || Spacewatch || — || align=right | 1.8 km || 
|-id=660 bgcolor=#E9E9E9
| 423660 ||  || — || December 2, 2005 || Mount Lemmon || Mount Lemmon Survey || — || align=right | 1.4 km || 
|-id=661 bgcolor=#E9E9E9
| 423661 ||  || — || December 24, 2005 || Kitt Peak || Spacewatch || — || align=right | 1.3 km || 
|-id=662 bgcolor=#E9E9E9
| 423662 ||  || — || December 24, 2005 || Kitt Peak || Spacewatch || — || align=right | 1.6 km || 
|-id=663 bgcolor=#E9E9E9
| 423663 ||  || — || December 25, 2005 || Mount Lemmon || Mount Lemmon Survey || — || align=right | 1.4 km || 
|-id=664 bgcolor=#E9E9E9
| 423664 ||  || — || December 26, 2005 || Kitt Peak || Spacewatch || — || align=right | 2.5 km || 
|-id=665 bgcolor=#E9E9E9
| 423665 ||  || — || December 26, 2005 || Kitt Peak || Spacewatch || — || align=right | 2.1 km || 
|-id=666 bgcolor=#E9E9E9
| 423666 ||  || — || January 18, 2002 || Cima Ekar || ADAS || — || align=right | 2.4 km || 
|-id=667 bgcolor=#E9E9E9
| 423667 ||  || — || December 28, 2005 || Mount Lemmon || Mount Lemmon Survey || — || align=right | 1.6 km || 
|-id=668 bgcolor=#E9E9E9
| 423668 ||  || — || December 28, 2005 || Mount Lemmon || Mount Lemmon Survey || — || align=right | 2.1 km || 
|-id=669 bgcolor=#E9E9E9
| 423669 ||  || — || December 25, 2005 || Kitt Peak || Spacewatch || — || align=right | 1.4 km || 
|-id=670 bgcolor=#E9E9E9
| 423670 ||  || — || December 22, 2005 || Kitt Peak || Spacewatch || — || align=right | 2.5 km || 
|-id=671 bgcolor=#E9E9E9
| 423671 ||  || — || December 30, 2005 || Kitt Peak || Spacewatch || — || align=right | 2.6 km || 
|-id=672 bgcolor=#E9E9E9
| 423672 ||  || — || December 28, 2005 || Mount Lemmon || Mount Lemmon Survey || — || align=right | 1.2 km || 
|-id=673 bgcolor=#E9E9E9
| 423673 ||  || — || December 28, 2005 || Kitt Peak || Spacewatch || — || align=right | 1.2 km || 
|-id=674 bgcolor=#E9E9E9
| 423674 ||  || — || December 28, 2005 || Mount Lemmon || Mount Lemmon Survey || — || align=right | 3.3 km || 
|-id=675 bgcolor=#E9E9E9
| 423675 ||  || — || December 29, 2005 || Kitt Peak || Spacewatch || MAR || align=right data-sort-value="0.89" | 890 m || 
|-id=676 bgcolor=#E9E9E9
| 423676 ||  || — || December 30, 2005 || Kitt Peak || Spacewatch || — || align=right | 1.8 km || 
|-id=677 bgcolor=#E9E9E9
| 423677 ||  || — || December 5, 2005 || Mount Lemmon || Mount Lemmon Survey || — || align=right data-sort-value="0.91" | 910 m || 
|-id=678 bgcolor=#E9E9E9
| 423678 ||  || — || December 25, 2005 || Kitt Peak || Spacewatch || — || align=right | 2.8 km || 
|-id=679 bgcolor=#E9E9E9
| 423679 ||  || — || December 26, 2005 || Kitt Peak || Spacewatch || — || align=right | 2.2 km || 
|-id=680 bgcolor=#E9E9E9
| 423680 ||  || — || December 29, 2005 || Socorro || LINEAR || — || align=right | 1.4 km || 
|-id=681 bgcolor=#E9E9E9
| 423681 ||  || — || December 30, 2005 || Kitt Peak || Spacewatch || GEF || align=right | 1.5 km || 
|-id=682 bgcolor=#E9E9E9
| 423682 ||  || — || December 25, 2005 || Mount Lemmon || Mount Lemmon Survey || — || align=right | 2.7 km || 
|-id=683 bgcolor=#E9E9E9
| 423683 ||  || — || December 29, 2005 || Kitt Peak || Spacewatch || — || align=right | 1.8 km || 
|-id=684 bgcolor=#E9E9E9
| 423684 ||  || — || December 30, 2005 || Kitt Peak || Spacewatch || — || align=right | 1.6 km || 
|-id=685 bgcolor=#E9E9E9
| 423685 ||  || — || September 10, 2000 || Anderson Mesa || LONEOS || EUN || align=right | 1.6 km || 
|-id=686 bgcolor=#E9E9E9
| 423686 ||  || — || December 26, 2005 || Mount Lemmon || Mount Lemmon Survey || — || align=right | 1.2 km || 
|-id=687 bgcolor=#d6d6d6
| 423687 ||  || — || December 5, 2005 || Mount Lemmon || Mount Lemmon Survey || — || align=right | 2.2 km || 
|-id=688 bgcolor=#E9E9E9
| 423688 ||  || — || December 27, 2005 || Mount Lemmon || Mount Lemmon Survey || MRX || align=right | 1.1 km || 
|-id=689 bgcolor=#E9E9E9
| 423689 ||  || — || December 27, 2005 || Kitt Peak || Spacewatch || (5) || align=right data-sort-value="0.86" | 860 m || 
|-id=690 bgcolor=#E9E9E9
| 423690 ||  || — || January 7, 2006 || Junk Bond || D. Healy || — || align=right | 1.5 km || 
|-id=691 bgcolor=#E9E9E9
| 423691 ||  || — || January 4, 2006 || Kitt Peak || Spacewatch || — || align=right | 1.6 km || 
|-id=692 bgcolor=#E9E9E9
| 423692 ||  || — || January 4, 2006 || Mount Lemmon || Mount Lemmon Survey || — || align=right | 3.0 km || 
|-id=693 bgcolor=#E9E9E9
| 423693 ||  || — || January 5, 2006 || Kitt Peak || Spacewatch || — || align=right | 1.5 km || 
|-id=694 bgcolor=#E9E9E9
| 423694 ||  || — || January 5, 2006 || Anderson Mesa || LONEOS || — || align=right | 2.0 km || 
|-id=695 bgcolor=#E9E9E9
| 423695 ||  || — || January 6, 2006 || Socorro || LINEAR || EUN || align=right | 1.5 km || 
|-id=696 bgcolor=#E9E9E9
| 423696 ||  || — || January 4, 2006 || Kitt Peak || Spacewatch || — || align=right | 1.2 km || 
|-id=697 bgcolor=#E9E9E9
| 423697 ||  || — || December 30, 2005 || Mount Lemmon || Mount Lemmon Survey || — || align=right | 2.3 km || 
|-id=698 bgcolor=#E9E9E9
| 423698 ||  || — || January 5, 2006 || Kitt Peak || Spacewatch || — || align=right | 1.3 km || 
|-id=699 bgcolor=#E9E9E9
| 423699 ||  || — || December 28, 2005 || Mount Lemmon || Mount Lemmon Survey || MRX || align=right | 1.0 km || 
|-id=700 bgcolor=#E9E9E9
| 423700 ||  || — || January 5, 2006 || Kitt Peak || Spacewatch || — || align=right | 2.0 km || 
|}

423701–423800 

|-bgcolor=#E9E9E9
| 423701 ||  || — || January 7, 2006 || Mount Lemmon || Mount Lemmon Survey || — || align=right | 1.1 km || 
|-id=702 bgcolor=#E9E9E9
| 423702 ||  || — || January 7, 2006 || Mount Lemmon || Mount Lemmon Survey || — || align=right data-sort-value="0.94" | 940 m || 
|-id=703 bgcolor=#E9E9E9
| 423703 ||  || — || January 6, 2006 || Kitt Peak || Spacewatch || — || align=right | 1.6 km || 
|-id=704 bgcolor=#E9E9E9
| 423704 ||  || — || January 5, 2006 || Kitt Peak || Spacewatch || — || align=right | 1.3 km || 
|-id=705 bgcolor=#E9E9E9
| 423705 ||  || — || January 8, 2006 || Kitt Peak || Spacewatch || — || align=right | 2.5 km || 
|-id=706 bgcolor=#d6d6d6
| 423706 ||  || — || January 10, 2006 || Kitt Peak || Spacewatch || — || align=right | 3.1 km || 
|-id=707 bgcolor=#E9E9E9
| 423707 ||  || — || January 7, 2006 || Mount Lemmon || Mount Lemmon Survey || — || align=right | 3.3 km || 
|-id=708 bgcolor=#E9E9E9
| 423708 ||  || — || January 21, 2006 || Kitt Peak || Spacewatch || MRX || align=right data-sort-value="0.94" | 940 m || 
|-id=709 bgcolor=#FFC2E0
| 423709 ||  || — || January 22, 2006 || Mount Lemmon || Mount Lemmon Survey || APOPHAcritical || align=right data-sort-value="0.41" | 410 m || 
|-id=710 bgcolor=#E9E9E9
| 423710 ||  || — || January 23, 2006 || Nyukasa || Mount Nyukasa Stn. || (5) || align=right data-sort-value="0.98" | 980 m || 
|-id=711 bgcolor=#E9E9E9
| 423711 ||  || — || January 22, 2006 || Mount Lemmon || Mount Lemmon Survey || — || align=right | 2.6 km || 
|-id=712 bgcolor=#E9E9E9
| 423712 ||  || — || January 25, 2006 || Junk Bond || D. Healy || — || align=right | 2.3 km || 
|-id=713 bgcolor=#E9E9E9
| 423713 ||  || — || January 22, 2006 || Catalina || CSS || — || align=right | 3.0 km || 
|-id=714 bgcolor=#E9E9E9
| 423714 ||  || — || January 23, 2006 || Kitt Peak || Spacewatch || — || align=right | 1.6 km || 
|-id=715 bgcolor=#E9E9E9
| 423715 ||  || — || January 23, 2006 || Kitt Peak || Spacewatch || — || align=right | 2.5 km || 
|-id=716 bgcolor=#E9E9E9
| 423716 ||  || — || January 23, 2006 || Kitt Peak || Spacewatch || — || align=right | 2.0 km || 
|-id=717 bgcolor=#E9E9E9
| 423717 ||  || — || January 23, 2006 || Kitt Peak || Spacewatch || — || align=right | 1.9 km || 
|-id=718 bgcolor=#E9E9E9
| 423718 ||  || — || January 23, 2006 || Kitt Peak || Spacewatch || — || align=right | 2.2 km || 
|-id=719 bgcolor=#E9E9E9
| 423719 ||  || — || January 23, 2006 || Kitt Peak || Spacewatch || — || align=right | 1.5 km || 
|-id=720 bgcolor=#E9E9E9
| 423720 ||  || — || January 25, 2006 || Kitt Peak || Spacewatch || — || align=right | 1.9 km || 
|-id=721 bgcolor=#E9E9E9
| 423721 ||  || — || January 25, 2006 || Kitt Peak || Spacewatch || MRX || align=right data-sort-value="0.87" | 870 m || 
|-id=722 bgcolor=#E9E9E9
| 423722 ||  || — || January 6, 2006 || Mount Lemmon || Mount Lemmon Survey || — || align=right | 1.5 km || 
|-id=723 bgcolor=#E9E9E9
| 423723 ||  || — || January 4, 2006 || Kitt Peak || Spacewatch || — || align=right | 1.5 km || 
|-id=724 bgcolor=#E9E9E9
| 423724 ||  || — || January 25, 2006 || Kitt Peak || Spacewatch || — || align=right | 2.7 km || 
|-id=725 bgcolor=#E9E9E9
| 423725 ||  || — || January 26, 2006 || Kitt Peak || Spacewatch || — || align=right | 2.9 km || 
|-id=726 bgcolor=#E9E9E9
| 423726 ||  || — || January 26, 2006 || Mount Lemmon || Mount Lemmon Survey || — || align=right | 2.6 km || 
|-id=727 bgcolor=#E9E9E9
| 423727 ||  || — || January 26, 2006 || Kitt Peak || Spacewatch || — || align=right | 1.7 km || 
|-id=728 bgcolor=#E9E9E9
| 423728 ||  || — || January 7, 2006 || Mount Lemmon || Mount Lemmon Survey || — || align=right | 2.4 km || 
|-id=729 bgcolor=#E9E9E9
| 423729 ||  || — || January 28, 2006 || Mount Lemmon || Mount Lemmon Survey || — || align=right | 1.7 km || 
|-id=730 bgcolor=#E9E9E9
| 423730 ||  || — || January 25, 2006 || Kitt Peak || Spacewatch || — || align=right | 2.1 km || 
|-id=731 bgcolor=#E9E9E9
| 423731 ||  || — || January 27, 2006 || Kitt Peak || Spacewatch || NEM || align=right | 2.3 km || 
|-id=732 bgcolor=#E9E9E9
| 423732 ||  || — || January 28, 2006 || Mount Lemmon || Mount Lemmon Survey || — || align=right | 1.7 km || 
|-id=733 bgcolor=#E9E9E9
| 423733 ||  || — || January 28, 2006 || Mount Lemmon || Mount Lemmon Survey || — || align=right | 2.8 km || 
|-id=734 bgcolor=#E9E9E9
| 423734 ||  || — || January 30, 2006 || Kitt Peak || Spacewatch ||  || align=right | 2.0 km || 
|-id=735 bgcolor=#d6d6d6
| 423735 ||  || — || January 31, 2006 || Kitt Peak || Spacewatch || KOR || align=right | 1.3 km || 
|-id=736 bgcolor=#E9E9E9
| 423736 ||  || — || January 31, 2006 || Mount Lemmon || Mount Lemmon Survey || DOR || align=right | 2.7 km || 
|-id=737 bgcolor=#E9E9E9
| 423737 ||  || — || January 31, 2006 || Mount Lemmon || Mount Lemmon Survey || — || align=right | 2.7 km || 
|-id=738 bgcolor=#E9E9E9
| 423738 ||  || — || January 30, 2006 || Kitt Peak || Spacewatch || — || align=right | 1.6 km || 
|-id=739 bgcolor=#E9E9E9
| 423739 ||  || — || January 31, 2006 || Kitt Peak || Spacewatch || — || align=right | 2.0 km || 
|-id=740 bgcolor=#E9E9E9
| 423740 ||  || — || January 31, 2006 || Kitt Peak || Spacewatch || — || align=right | 1.5 km || 
|-id=741 bgcolor=#E9E9E9
| 423741 ||  || — || January 23, 2006 || Kitt Peak || Spacewatch || — || align=right | 1.7 km || 
|-id=742 bgcolor=#E9E9E9
| 423742 ||  || — || January 31, 2006 || Kitt Peak || Spacewatch || — || align=right | 1.3 km || 
|-id=743 bgcolor=#E9E9E9
| 423743 ||  || — || January 31, 2006 || Kitt Peak || Spacewatch || AGN || align=right | 1.1 km || 
|-id=744 bgcolor=#E9E9E9
| 423744 ||  || — || January 25, 2006 || Kitt Peak || Spacewatch || — || align=right | 2.2 km || 
|-id=745 bgcolor=#C2FFFF
| 423745 ||  || — || January 26, 2006 || Mount Lemmon || Mount Lemmon Survey || L5 || align=right | 9.2 km || 
|-id=746 bgcolor=#E9E9E9
| 423746 ||  || — || January 26, 2006 || Mount Lemmon || Mount Lemmon Survey || — || align=right | 2.1 km || 
|-id=747 bgcolor=#FFC2E0
| 423747 ||  || — || February 3, 2006 || Catalina || CSS || AMO || align=right data-sort-value="0.59" | 590 m || 
|-id=748 bgcolor=#E9E9E9
| 423748 ||  || — || February 1, 2006 || Mount Lemmon || Mount Lemmon Survey || — || align=right | 2.6 km || 
|-id=749 bgcolor=#E9E9E9
| 423749 ||  || — || February 1, 2006 || Mount Lemmon || Mount Lemmon Survey || — || align=right | 2.6 km || 
|-id=750 bgcolor=#E9E9E9
| 423750 ||  || — || December 28, 2005 || Kitt Peak || Spacewatch || — || align=right | 1.6 km || 
|-id=751 bgcolor=#E9E9E9
| 423751 ||  || — || January 25, 2006 || Kitt Peak || Spacewatch || — || align=right | 2.1 km || 
|-id=752 bgcolor=#d6d6d6
| 423752 ||  || — || December 28, 2005 || Mount Lemmon || Mount Lemmon Survey || — || align=right | 2.3 km || 
|-id=753 bgcolor=#E9E9E9
| 423753 ||  || — || February 20, 2006 || Catalina || CSS || — || align=right | 1.8 km || 
|-id=754 bgcolor=#E9E9E9
| 423754 ||  || — || February 20, 2006 || Kitt Peak || Spacewatch || GEF || align=right | 1.4 km || 
|-id=755 bgcolor=#E9E9E9
| 423755 ||  || — || February 20, 2006 || Kitt Peak || Spacewatch || — || align=right | 2.2 km || 
|-id=756 bgcolor=#E9E9E9
| 423756 ||  || — || February 20, 2006 || Kitt Peak || Spacewatch || — || align=right | 3.4 km || 
|-id=757 bgcolor=#E9E9E9
| 423757 ||  || — || February 20, 2006 || Kitt Peak || Spacewatch || HOF || align=right | 2.4 km || 
|-id=758 bgcolor=#d6d6d6
| 423758 ||  || — || January 30, 2006 || Kitt Peak || Spacewatch || — || align=right | 2.5 km || 
|-id=759 bgcolor=#E9E9E9
| 423759 ||  || — || February 21, 2006 || Catalina || CSS || — || align=right | 3.0 km || 
|-id=760 bgcolor=#E9E9E9
| 423760 ||  || — || February 24, 2006 || Kitt Peak || Spacewatch || — || align=right | 2.1 km || 
|-id=761 bgcolor=#E9E9E9
| 423761 ||  || — || October 18, 2003 || Kitt Peak || Spacewatch || — || align=right | 3.2 km || 
|-id=762 bgcolor=#E9E9E9
| 423762 ||  || — || February 24, 2006 || Kitt Peak || Spacewatch || — || align=right | 2.0 km || 
|-id=763 bgcolor=#E9E9E9
| 423763 ||  || — || February 25, 2006 || Kitt Peak || Spacewatch || — || align=right | 2.8 km || 
|-id=764 bgcolor=#E9E9E9
| 423764 ||  || — || February 25, 2006 || Mount Lemmon || Mount Lemmon Survey || — || align=right | 1.6 km || 
|-id=765 bgcolor=#E9E9E9
| 423765 ||  || — || February 25, 2006 || Kitt Peak || Spacewatch || ADE || align=right | 2.1 km || 
|-id=766 bgcolor=#E9E9E9
| 423766 ||  || — || February 27, 2006 || Kitt Peak || Spacewatch ||  || align=right | 2.4 km || 
|-id=767 bgcolor=#d6d6d6
| 423767 ||  || — || January 26, 2006 || Catalina || CSS || — || align=right | 3.2 km || 
|-id=768 bgcolor=#E9E9E9
| 423768 ||  || — || February 25, 2006 || Kitt Peak || Spacewatch || NEM || align=right | 2.5 km || 
|-id=769 bgcolor=#E9E9E9
| 423769 ||  || — || January 30, 2006 || Kitt Peak || Spacewatch || — || align=right | 2.0 km || 
|-id=770 bgcolor=#E9E9E9
| 423770 ||  || — || February 25, 2006 || Mount Lemmon || Mount Lemmon Survey || MRX || align=right data-sort-value="0.97" | 970 m || 
|-id=771 bgcolor=#d6d6d6
| 423771 ||  || — || February 25, 2006 || Kitt Peak || Spacewatch || — || align=right | 2.2 km || 
|-id=772 bgcolor=#E9E9E9
| 423772 ||  || — || February 25, 2006 || Kitt Peak || Spacewatch || — || align=right | 1.9 km || 
|-id=773 bgcolor=#d6d6d6
| 423773 ||  || — || February 25, 2006 || Kitt Peak || Spacewatch || BRA || align=right | 1.3 km || 
|-id=774 bgcolor=#E9E9E9
| 423774 ||  || — || February 27, 2006 || Kitt Peak || Spacewatch || — || align=right | 2.3 km || 
|-id=775 bgcolor=#d6d6d6
| 423775 ||  || — || February 27, 2006 || Kitt Peak || Spacewatch || EOS || align=right | 1.7 km || 
|-id=776 bgcolor=#E9E9E9
| 423776 ||  || — || February 28, 2006 || Socorro || LINEAR || — || align=right | 2.0 km || 
|-id=777 bgcolor=#E9E9E9
| 423777 ||  || — || February 21, 2006 || Mount Lemmon || Mount Lemmon Survey || — || align=right | 2.5 km || 
|-id=778 bgcolor=#E9E9E9
| 423778 ||  || — || March 2, 2006 || Kitt Peak || Spacewatch || — || align=right | 2.5 km || 
|-id=779 bgcolor=#d6d6d6
| 423779 ||  || — || March 3, 2006 || Kitt Peak || Spacewatch || — || align=right | 2.6 km || 
|-id=780 bgcolor=#E9E9E9
| 423780 ||  || — || March 5, 2006 || Mount Lemmon || Mount Lemmon Survey || — || align=right | 2.3 km || 
|-id=781 bgcolor=#E9E9E9
| 423781 ||  || — || March 3, 2006 || Catalina || CSS || ADE || align=right | 3.6 km || 
|-id=782 bgcolor=#E9E9E9
| 423782 ||  || — || March 6, 2006 || Kitt Peak || Spacewatch || — || align=right | 1.9 km || 
|-id=783 bgcolor=#E9E9E9
| 423783 ||  || — || March 2, 2006 || Kitt Peak || Spacewatch || — || align=right | 2.2 km || 
|-id=784 bgcolor=#E9E9E9
| 423784 ||  || — || February 20, 2006 || Kitt Peak || Spacewatch || — || align=right | 1.9 km || 
|-id=785 bgcolor=#E9E9E9
| 423785 ||  || — || March 23, 2006 || Kitt Peak || Spacewatch || — || align=right | 2.0 km || 
|-id=786 bgcolor=#d6d6d6
| 423786 ||  || — || March 3, 2006 || Mount Lemmon || Mount Lemmon Survey || — || align=right | 4.4 km || 
|-id=787 bgcolor=#E9E9E9
| 423787 ||  || — || March 29, 2006 || Kitt Peak || Spacewatch || — || align=right | 2.8 km || 
|-id=788 bgcolor=#E9E9E9
| 423788 ||  || — || April 2, 2006 || Kitt Peak || Spacewatch || — || align=right | 2.7 km || 
|-id=789 bgcolor=#d6d6d6
| 423789 ||  || — || March 23, 2006 || Kitt Peak || Spacewatch || HYG || align=right | 2.2 km || 
|-id=790 bgcolor=#d6d6d6
| 423790 ||  || — || April 2, 2006 || Anderson Mesa || LONEOS || — || align=right | 2.8 km || 
|-id=791 bgcolor=#E9E9E9
| 423791 ||  || — || April 2, 2006 || Anderson Mesa || LONEOS || — || align=right | 2.4 km || 
|-id=792 bgcolor=#fefefe
| 423792 ||  || — || November 3, 2004 || Kitt Peak || Spacewatch || — || align=right | 1.1 km || 
|-id=793 bgcolor=#E9E9E9
| 423793 ||  || — || April 18, 2006 || Catalina || CSS || — || align=right | 2.3 km || 
|-id=794 bgcolor=#d6d6d6
| 423794 ||  || — || April 20, 2006 || Kitt Peak || Spacewatch || Tj (2.95) || align=right | 4.2 km || 
|-id=795 bgcolor=#E9E9E9
| 423795 ||  || — || April 19, 2006 || Catalina || CSS || — || align=right | 2.6 km || 
|-id=796 bgcolor=#d6d6d6
| 423796 ||  || — || April 21, 2006 || Kitt Peak || Spacewatch || — || align=right | 3.4 km || 
|-id=797 bgcolor=#E9E9E9
| 423797 ||  || — || April 21, 2006 || Kitt Peak || Spacewatch || CLO || align=right | 1.9 km || 
|-id=798 bgcolor=#E9E9E9
| 423798 ||  || — || April 19, 2006 || Catalina || CSS || — || align=right | 2.8 km || 
|-id=799 bgcolor=#E9E9E9
| 423799 ||  || — || April 26, 2006 || Anderson Mesa || LONEOS || — || align=right | 2.6 km || 
|-id=800 bgcolor=#d6d6d6
| 423800 ||  || — || April 24, 2006 || Kitt Peak || Spacewatch || — || align=right | 2.6 km || 
|}

423801–423900 

|-bgcolor=#E9E9E9
| 423801 ||  || — || April 24, 2006 || Kitt Peak || Spacewatch || — || align=right | 3.1 km || 
|-id=802 bgcolor=#d6d6d6
| 423802 ||  || — || April 25, 2006 || Kitt Peak || Spacewatch || — || align=right | 2.5 km || 
|-id=803 bgcolor=#d6d6d6
| 423803 ||  || — || April 26, 2006 || Kitt Peak || Spacewatch || — || align=right | 2.9 km || 
|-id=804 bgcolor=#fefefe
| 423804 ||  || — || April 29, 2006 || Kitt Peak || Spacewatch || — || align=right data-sort-value="0.65" | 650 m || 
|-id=805 bgcolor=#d6d6d6
| 423805 ||  || — || April 29, 2006 || Kitt Peak || Spacewatch || — || align=right | 2.6 km || 
|-id=806 bgcolor=#d6d6d6
| 423806 ||  || — || April 30, 2006 || Kitt Peak || Spacewatch || — || align=right | 2.5 km || 
|-id=807 bgcolor=#E9E9E9
| 423807 ||  || — || April 21, 2006 || Catalina || CSS || — || align=right | 2.5 km || 
|-id=808 bgcolor=#d6d6d6
| 423808 ||  || — || April 25, 2006 || Kitt Peak || Spacewatch || — || align=right | 3.1 km || 
|-id=809 bgcolor=#E9E9E9
| 423809 ||  || — || May 2, 2006 || Mount Lemmon || Mount Lemmon Survey || — || align=right | 2.4 km || 
|-id=810 bgcolor=#E9E9E9
| 423810 ||  || — || May 3, 2006 || Mount Lemmon || Mount Lemmon Survey || — || align=right | 2.2 km || 
|-id=811 bgcolor=#d6d6d6
| 423811 ||  || — || May 4, 2006 || Kitt Peak || Spacewatch || — || align=right | 2.8 km || 
|-id=812 bgcolor=#d6d6d6
| 423812 ||  || — || May 4, 2006 || Kitt Peak || Spacewatch || — || align=right | 2.4 km || 
|-id=813 bgcolor=#E9E9E9
| 423813 ||  || — || May 6, 2006 || Kitt Peak || Spacewatch ||  || align=right | 1.7 km || 
|-id=814 bgcolor=#fefefe
| 423814 ||  || — || April 30, 2006 || Catalina || CSS || — || align=right | 1.2 km || 
|-id=815 bgcolor=#d6d6d6
| 423815 ||  || — || May 20, 2006 || Kitt Peak || Spacewatch || — || align=right | 3.6 km || 
|-id=816 bgcolor=#d6d6d6
| 423816 ||  || — || May 21, 2006 || Kitt Peak || Spacewatch || — || align=right | 4.4 km || 
|-id=817 bgcolor=#d6d6d6
| 423817 ||  || — || May 20, 2006 || Kitt Peak || Spacewatch || — || align=right | 2.7 km || 
|-id=818 bgcolor=#fefefe
| 423818 ||  || — || May 20, 2006 || Mount Lemmon || Mount Lemmon Survey || — || align=right data-sort-value="0.56" | 560 m || 
|-id=819 bgcolor=#fefefe
| 423819 ||  || — || May 9, 2006 || Mount Lemmon || Mount Lemmon Survey || — || align=right data-sort-value="0.82" | 820 m || 
|-id=820 bgcolor=#d6d6d6
| 423820 ||  || — || May 21, 2006 || Kitt Peak || Spacewatch || GEF || align=right | 1.3 km || 
|-id=821 bgcolor=#fefefe
| 423821 ||  || — || May 8, 2006 || Kitt Peak || Spacewatch || — || align=right data-sort-value="0.79" | 790 m || 
|-id=822 bgcolor=#d6d6d6
| 423822 ||  || — || May 9, 2006 || Mount Lemmon || Mount Lemmon Survey || — || align=right | 3.2 km || 
|-id=823 bgcolor=#d6d6d6
| 423823 ||  || — || May 23, 2006 || Kitt Peak || Spacewatch || EOS || align=right | 2.4 km || 
|-id=824 bgcolor=#E9E9E9
| 423824 ||  || — || May 21, 2006 || Mount Lemmon || Mount Lemmon Survey || — || align=right | 1.8 km || 
|-id=825 bgcolor=#d6d6d6
| 423825 ||  || — || May 31, 2006 || Kitt Peak || Spacewatch || — || align=right | 2.9 km || 
|-id=826 bgcolor=#d6d6d6
| 423826 ||  || — || May 31, 2006 || Kitt Peak || Spacewatch || — || align=right | 2.2 km || 
|-id=827 bgcolor=#d6d6d6
| 423827 ||  || — || May 30, 2006 || Mount Lemmon || Mount Lemmon Survey || — || align=right | 3.6 km || 
|-id=828 bgcolor=#d6d6d6
| 423828 ||  || — || May 24, 2006 || Mount Lemmon || Mount Lemmon Survey || — || align=right | 3.3 km || 
|-id=829 bgcolor=#FA8072
| 423829 ||  || — || June 17, 2006 || Kitt Peak || Spacewatch || — || align=right data-sort-value="0.67" | 670 m || 
|-id=830 bgcolor=#d6d6d6
| 423830 ||  || — || May 24, 2006 || Mount Lemmon || Mount Lemmon Survey || — || align=right | 3.1 km || 
|-id=831 bgcolor=#fefefe
| 423831 ||  || — || July 17, 2006 || Eskridge || Farpoint Obs. || MAS || align=right data-sort-value="0.73" | 730 m || 
|-id=832 bgcolor=#fefefe
| 423832 ||  || — || July 18, 2006 || Mount Lemmon || Mount Lemmon Survey || MAS || align=right data-sort-value="0.69" | 690 m || 
|-id=833 bgcolor=#d6d6d6
| 423833 ||  || — || July 20, 2006 || Palomar || NEAT || — || align=right | 6.1 km || 
|-id=834 bgcolor=#fefefe
| 423834 ||  || — || July 20, 2006 || Palomar || NEAT || — || align=right | 1.8 km || 
|-id=835 bgcolor=#fefefe
| 423835 ||  || — || August 12, 2006 || Palomar || NEAT || — || align=right | 1.2 km || 
|-id=836 bgcolor=#fefefe
| 423836 ||  || — || August 15, 2006 || Palomar || NEAT || — || align=right data-sort-value="0.91" | 910 m || 
|-id=837 bgcolor=#d6d6d6
| 423837 ||  || — || August 15, 2006 || Palomar || NEAT || 7:4 || align=right | 6.1 km || 
|-id=838 bgcolor=#fefefe
| 423838 ||  || — || August 19, 2006 || Kitt Peak || Spacewatch || — || align=right data-sort-value="0.72" | 720 m || 
|-id=839 bgcolor=#d6d6d6
| 423839 ||  || — || August 17, 2006 || Palomar || NEAT || — || align=right | 4.3 km || 
|-id=840 bgcolor=#fefefe
| 423840 ||  || — || August 18, 2006 || Kitt Peak || Spacewatch || — || align=right data-sort-value="0.71" | 710 m || 
|-id=841 bgcolor=#fefefe
| 423841 ||  || — || August 18, 2006 || Kitt Peak || Spacewatch || NYS || align=right data-sort-value="0.71" | 710 m || 
|-id=842 bgcolor=#fefefe
| 423842 ||  || — || August 20, 2006 || Kitt Peak || Spacewatch || — || align=right data-sort-value="0.86" | 860 m || 
|-id=843 bgcolor=#d6d6d6
| 423843 ||  || — || August 19, 2006 || Anderson Mesa || LONEOS || — || align=right | 4.8 km || 
|-id=844 bgcolor=#fefefe
| 423844 ||  || — || August 19, 2006 || Palomar || NEAT || — || align=right | 1.9 km || 
|-id=845 bgcolor=#fefefe
| 423845 ||  || — || July 25, 2006 || Mount Lemmon || Mount Lemmon Survey || — || align=right data-sort-value="0.78" | 780 m || 
|-id=846 bgcolor=#fefefe
| 423846 ||  || — || August 27, 2006 || Kitt Peak || Spacewatch || MAS || align=right data-sort-value="0.67" | 670 m || 
|-id=847 bgcolor=#fefefe
| 423847 ||  || — || August 27, 2006 || Kitt Peak || Spacewatch || MAS || align=right data-sort-value="0.66" | 660 m || 
|-id=848 bgcolor=#fefefe
| 423848 ||  || — || August 21, 2006 || Kitt Peak || Spacewatch || — || align=right data-sort-value="0.75" | 750 m || 
|-id=849 bgcolor=#d6d6d6
| 423849 ||  || — || August 16, 2006 || Palomar || NEAT || TIR || align=right | 4.3 km || 
|-id=850 bgcolor=#d6d6d6
| 423850 ||  || — || August 16, 2006 || Palomar || NEAT || — || align=right | 3.9 km || 
|-id=851 bgcolor=#fefefe
| 423851 ||  || — || August 16, 2006 || Palomar || NEAT || — || align=right data-sort-value="0.86" | 860 m || 
|-id=852 bgcolor=#fefefe
| 423852 ||  || — || August 27, 2006 || Anderson Mesa || LONEOS || — || align=right data-sort-value="0.69" | 690 m || 
|-id=853 bgcolor=#fefefe
| 423853 ||  || — || August 27, 2006 || Anderson Mesa || LONEOS || ERI || align=right | 1.9 km || 
|-id=854 bgcolor=#fefefe
| 423854 ||  || — || August 20, 2006 || Palomar || NEAT || NYS || align=right data-sort-value="0.76" | 760 m || 
|-id=855 bgcolor=#fefefe
| 423855 ||  || — || August 23, 2006 || Palomar || NEAT || — || align=right | 1.6 km || 
|-id=856 bgcolor=#fefefe
| 423856 ||  || — || August 16, 2006 || Palomar || NEAT || — || align=right data-sort-value="0.61" | 610 m || 
|-id=857 bgcolor=#d6d6d6
| 423857 ||  || — || August 18, 2006 || Kitt Peak || Spacewatch || — || align=right | 3.2 km || 
|-id=858 bgcolor=#d6d6d6
| 423858 ||  || — || August 21, 2006 || Kitt Peak || Spacewatch || — || align=right | 4.7 km || 
|-id=859 bgcolor=#fefefe
| 423859 ||  || — || August 29, 2006 || Anderson Mesa || LONEOS || — || align=right data-sort-value="0.92" | 920 m || 
|-id=860 bgcolor=#fefefe
| 423860 ||  || — || August 19, 2006 || Kitt Peak || Spacewatch || — || align=right data-sort-value="0.68" | 680 m || 
|-id=861 bgcolor=#fefefe
| 423861 ||  || — || September 14, 2006 || Catalina || CSS || — || align=right | 1.1 km || 
|-id=862 bgcolor=#fefefe
| 423862 ||  || — || August 29, 2006 || Anderson Mesa || LONEOS || — || align=right | 1.1 km || 
|-id=863 bgcolor=#fefefe
| 423863 ||  || — || September 14, 2006 || Kitt Peak || Spacewatch || — || align=right data-sort-value="0.79" | 790 m || 
|-id=864 bgcolor=#d6d6d6
| 423864 ||  || — || September 14, 2006 || Palomar || NEAT || — || align=right | 3.7 km || 
|-id=865 bgcolor=#fefefe
| 423865 ||  || — || August 29, 2006 || Catalina || CSS || — || align=right data-sort-value="0.80" | 800 m || 
|-id=866 bgcolor=#d6d6d6
| 423866 ||  || — || September 15, 2006 || Kitt Peak || Spacewatch || — || align=right | 4.9 km || 
|-id=867 bgcolor=#fefefe
| 423867 ||  || — || September 14, 2006 || Kitt Peak || Spacewatch || — || align=right data-sort-value="0.74" | 740 m || 
|-id=868 bgcolor=#fefefe
| 423868 ||  || — || September 15, 2006 || Kitt Peak || Spacewatch || — || align=right data-sort-value="0.78" | 780 m || 
|-id=869 bgcolor=#fefefe
| 423869 ||  || — || September 15, 2006 || Kitt Peak || Spacewatch || — || align=right data-sort-value="0.69" | 690 m || 
|-id=870 bgcolor=#fefefe
| 423870 ||  || — || August 28, 2006 || Anderson Mesa || LONEOS || NYS || align=right data-sort-value="0.76" | 760 m || 
|-id=871 bgcolor=#fefefe
| 423871 ||  || — || September 12, 2006 || Catalina || CSS || — || align=right data-sort-value="0.73" | 730 m || 
|-id=872 bgcolor=#fefefe
| 423872 ||  || — || September 14, 2006 || Kitt Peak || Spacewatch || NYS || align=right data-sort-value="0.58" | 580 m || 
|-id=873 bgcolor=#d6d6d6
| 423873 ||  || — || September 14, 2006 || Kitt Peak || Spacewatch || 7:4 || align=right | 2.9 km || 
|-id=874 bgcolor=#fefefe
| 423874 ||  || — || September 14, 2006 || Kitt Peak || Spacewatch || — || align=right data-sort-value="0.68" | 680 m || 
|-id=875 bgcolor=#d6d6d6
| 423875 ||  || — || September 17, 1995 || Kitt Peak || Spacewatch || — || align=right | 3.2 km || 
|-id=876 bgcolor=#fefefe
| 423876 ||  || — || September 14, 2006 || Catalina || CSS || — || align=right data-sort-value="0.87" | 870 m || 
|-id=877 bgcolor=#fefefe
| 423877 ||  || — || August 27, 2006 || Anderson Mesa || LONEOS || — || align=right data-sort-value="0.70" | 700 m || 
|-id=878 bgcolor=#d6d6d6
| 423878 ||  || — || September 15, 2006 || Kitt Peak || Spacewatch || — || align=right | 3.9 km || 
|-id=879 bgcolor=#fefefe
| 423879 ||  || — || September 15, 2006 || Kitt Peak || Spacewatch || — || align=right data-sort-value="0.65" | 650 m || 
|-id=880 bgcolor=#fefefe
| 423880 ||  || — || September 15, 2006 || Kitt Peak || Spacewatch || — || align=right data-sort-value="0.92" | 920 m || 
|-id=881 bgcolor=#fefefe
| 423881 ||  || — || September 15, 2006 || Kitt Peak || Spacewatch || — || align=right data-sort-value="0.68" | 680 m || 
|-id=882 bgcolor=#fefefe
| 423882 ||  || — || September 15, 2006 || Kitt Peak || Spacewatch || — || align=right data-sort-value="0.71" | 710 m || 
|-id=883 bgcolor=#fefefe
| 423883 ||  || — || September 15, 2006 || Kitt Peak || Spacewatch || NYS || align=right data-sort-value="0.54" | 540 m || 
|-id=884 bgcolor=#fefefe
| 423884 ||  || — || September 15, 2006 || Kitt Peak || Spacewatch || NYS || align=right data-sort-value="0.50" | 500 m || 
|-id=885 bgcolor=#fefefe
| 423885 ||  || — || September 15, 2006 || Kitt Peak || Spacewatch || NYS || align=right data-sort-value="0.60" | 600 m || 
|-id=886 bgcolor=#fefefe
| 423886 ||  || — || September 14, 2006 || Kitt Peak || Spacewatch || — || align=right data-sort-value="0.87" | 870 m || 
|-id=887 bgcolor=#d6d6d6
| 423887 ||  || — || September 17, 2006 || Kitt Peak || Spacewatch || (1118) || align=right | 4.4 km || 
|-id=888 bgcolor=#fefefe
| 423888 ||  || — || September 17, 2006 || Catalina || CSS || — || align=right data-sort-value="0.98" | 980 m || 
|-id=889 bgcolor=#fefefe
| 423889 ||  || — || September 17, 2006 || Kitt Peak || Spacewatch || — || align=right data-sort-value="0.78" | 780 m || 
|-id=890 bgcolor=#fefefe
| 423890 ||  || — || September 18, 2006 || Catalina || CSS || — || align=right data-sort-value="0.81" | 810 m || 
|-id=891 bgcolor=#fefefe
| 423891 ||  || — || August 21, 2006 || Kitt Peak || Spacewatch || V || align=right data-sort-value="0.55" | 550 m || 
|-id=892 bgcolor=#d6d6d6
| 423892 ||  || — || September 20, 2006 || Kitt Peak || Spacewatch || — || align=right | 3.9 km || 
|-id=893 bgcolor=#fefefe
| 423893 ||  || — || September 18, 2006 || Anderson Mesa || LONEOS || NYS || align=right data-sort-value="0.70" | 700 m || 
|-id=894 bgcolor=#fefefe
| 423894 ||  || — || September 18, 2006 || Catalina || CSS || — || align=right | 1.0 km || 
|-id=895 bgcolor=#d6d6d6
| 423895 ||  || — || September 15, 2006 || Kitt Peak || Spacewatch || — || align=right | 2.8 km || 
|-id=896 bgcolor=#fefefe
| 423896 ||  || — || September 18, 2006 || Kitt Peak || Spacewatch || — || align=right data-sort-value="0.62" | 620 m || 
|-id=897 bgcolor=#fefefe
| 423897 ||  || — || September 18, 2006 || Kitt Peak || Spacewatch || — || align=right data-sort-value="0.72" | 720 m || 
|-id=898 bgcolor=#fefefe
| 423898 ||  || — || September 21, 2006 || Anderson Mesa || LONEOS || — || align=right | 1.1 km || 
|-id=899 bgcolor=#fefefe
| 423899 ||  || — || September 26, 2006 || Mount Lemmon || Mount Lemmon Survey || — || align=right data-sort-value="0.70" | 700 m || 
|-id=900 bgcolor=#fefefe
| 423900 ||  || — || September 24, 2006 || Kitt Peak || Spacewatch || MAS || align=right data-sort-value="0.64" | 640 m || 
|}

423901–424000 

|-bgcolor=#fefefe
| 423901 ||  || — || September 26, 2006 || Socorro || LINEAR || MAS || align=right data-sort-value="0.67" | 670 m || 
|-id=902 bgcolor=#fefefe
| 423902 ||  || — || September 26, 2006 || Kitt Peak || Spacewatch || — || align=right data-sort-value="0.72" | 720 m || 
|-id=903 bgcolor=#fefefe
| 423903 ||  || — || September 26, 2006 || Kitt Peak || Spacewatch || — || align=right data-sort-value="0.70" | 700 m || 
|-id=904 bgcolor=#fefefe
| 423904 ||  || — || April 2, 2005 || Mount Lemmon || Mount Lemmon Survey || — || align=right data-sort-value="0.83" | 830 m || 
|-id=905 bgcolor=#d6d6d6
| 423905 ||  || — || September 26, 2006 || Kitt Peak || Spacewatch || — || align=right | 3.9 km || 
|-id=906 bgcolor=#fefefe
| 423906 ||  || — || September 27, 2006 || Mount Lemmon || Mount Lemmon Survey || — || align=right data-sort-value="0.88" | 880 m || 
|-id=907 bgcolor=#fefefe
| 423907 ||  || — || September 19, 2006 || Catalina || CSS || — || align=right | 1.3 km || 
|-id=908 bgcolor=#fefefe
| 423908 ||  || — || September 25, 2006 || Mount Lemmon || Mount Lemmon Survey || MAS || align=right data-sort-value="0.64" | 640 m || 
|-id=909 bgcolor=#fefefe
| 423909 ||  || — || September 19, 2006 || Catalina || CSS || — || align=right data-sort-value="0.89" | 890 m || 
|-id=910 bgcolor=#fefefe
| 423910 ||  || — || September 27, 2006 || Kitt Peak || Spacewatch || — || align=right data-sort-value="0.68" | 680 m || 
|-id=911 bgcolor=#fefefe
| 423911 ||  || — || October 20, 1995 || Kitt Peak || Spacewatch || MAS || align=right data-sort-value="0.54" | 540 m || 
|-id=912 bgcolor=#fefefe
| 423912 ||  || — || September 27, 2006 || Kitt Peak || Spacewatch || — || align=right data-sort-value="0.72" | 720 m || 
|-id=913 bgcolor=#fefefe
| 423913 ||  || — || September 27, 2006 || Kitt Peak || Spacewatch || — || align=right data-sort-value="0.71" | 710 m || 
|-id=914 bgcolor=#fefefe
| 423914 ||  || — || September 27, 2006 || Kitt Peak || Spacewatch || — || align=right data-sort-value="0.58" | 580 m || 
|-id=915 bgcolor=#fefefe
| 423915 ||  || — || September 14, 2006 || Kitt Peak || Spacewatch || MAS || align=right data-sort-value="0.65" | 650 m || 
|-id=916 bgcolor=#fefefe
| 423916 ||  || — || September 18, 2006 || Catalina || CSS || — || align=right data-sort-value="0.82" | 820 m || 
|-id=917 bgcolor=#fefefe
| 423917 ||  || — || September 28, 2006 || Kitt Peak || Spacewatch || V || align=right data-sort-value="0.68" | 680 m || 
|-id=918 bgcolor=#fefefe
| 423918 ||  || — || August 21, 2006 || Kitt Peak || Spacewatch || — || align=right data-sort-value="0.92" | 920 m || 
|-id=919 bgcolor=#fefefe
| 423919 ||  || — || September 30, 2006 || Mount Lemmon || Mount Lemmon Survey || — || align=right data-sort-value="0.89" | 890 m || 
|-id=920 bgcolor=#fefefe
| 423920 ||  || — || September 30, 2006 || Mount Lemmon || Mount Lemmon Survey || V || align=right data-sort-value="0.48" | 480 m || 
|-id=921 bgcolor=#fefefe
| 423921 ||  || — || September 30, 2006 || Mount Lemmon || Mount Lemmon Survey || — || align=right data-sort-value="0.88" | 880 m || 
|-id=922 bgcolor=#fefefe
| 423922 ||  || — || September 27, 2006 || Mount Lemmon || Mount Lemmon Survey || MAS || align=right data-sort-value="0.72" | 720 m || 
|-id=923 bgcolor=#fefefe
| 423923 ||  || — || September 17, 2006 || Mauna Kea || J. Masiero || — || align=right data-sort-value="0.52" | 520 m || 
|-id=924 bgcolor=#fefefe
| 423924 ||  || — || September 17, 2006 || Kitt Peak || Spacewatch || — || align=right data-sort-value="0.70" | 700 m || 
|-id=925 bgcolor=#fefefe
| 423925 ||  || — || January 30, 2004 || Kitt Peak || Spacewatch || — || align=right data-sort-value="0.59" | 590 m || 
|-id=926 bgcolor=#fefefe
| 423926 ||  || — || September 27, 2006 || Mount Lemmon || Mount Lemmon Survey || — || align=right | 1.0 km || 
|-id=927 bgcolor=#d6d6d6
| 423927 ||  || — || September 18, 2006 || Kitt Peak || Spacewatch || — || align=right | 2.9 km || 
|-id=928 bgcolor=#fefefe
| 423928 ||  || — || September 19, 2006 || Catalina || CSS || — || align=right | 1.0 km || 
|-id=929 bgcolor=#fefefe
| 423929 ||  || — || September 18, 2006 || Catalina || CSS || — || align=right data-sort-value="0.75" | 750 m || 
|-id=930 bgcolor=#fefefe
| 423930 ||  || — || September 18, 2006 || Kitt Peak || Spacewatch || — || align=right data-sort-value="0.68" | 680 m || 
|-id=931 bgcolor=#fefefe
| 423931 ||  || — || September 25, 2006 || Mount Lemmon || Mount Lemmon Survey || NYS || align=right data-sort-value="0.62" | 620 m || 
|-id=932 bgcolor=#fefefe
| 423932 ||  || — || October 12, 2006 || Kitt Peak || Spacewatch || — || align=right data-sort-value="0.71" | 710 m || 
|-id=933 bgcolor=#fefefe
| 423933 ||  || — || October 12, 2006 || Kitt Peak || Spacewatch || — || align=right data-sort-value="0.80" | 800 m || 
|-id=934 bgcolor=#fefefe
| 423934 ||  || — || October 11, 2006 || Palomar || NEAT || — || align=right data-sort-value="0.80" | 800 m || 
|-id=935 bgcolor=#fefefe
| 423935 ||  || — || October 13, 2006 || Kitt Peak || Spacewatch || V || align=right data-sort-value="0.71" | 710 m || 
|-id=936 bgcolor=#fefefe
| 423936 ||  || — || October 4, 2006 || Mount Lemmon || Mount Lemmon Survey || — || align=right data-sort-value="0.89" | 890 m || 
|-id=937 bgcolor=#d6d6d6
| 423937 ||  || — || October 15, 2006 || Kitt Peak || Spacewatch || — || align=right | 3.1 km || 
|-id=938 bgcolor=#d6d6d6
| 423938 ||  || — || October 3, 2006 || Apache Point || A. C. Becker || — || align=right | 3.0 km || 
|-id=939 bgcolor=#fefefe
| 423939 ||  || — || October 3, 2006 || Mount Lemmon || Mount Lemmon Survey || V || align=right data-sort-value="0.62" | 620 m || 
|-id=940 bgcolor=#fefefe
| 423940 ||  || — || October 13, 2006 || Kitt Peak || Spacewatch || — || align=right data-sort-value="0.78" | 780 m || 
|-id=941 bgcolor=#d6d6d6
| 423941 ||  || — || October 3, 2006 || Mount Lemmon || Mount Lemmon Survey || VER || align=right | 2.6 km || 
|-id=942 bgcolor=#E9E9E9
| 423942 ||  || — || October 12, 2006 || Kitt Peak || Spacewatch || — || align=right data-sort-value="0.85" | 850 m || 
|-id=943 bgcolor=#fefefe
| 423943 ||  || — || October 2, 2006 || Mount Lemmon || Mount Lemmon Survey || — || align=right data-sort-value="0.94" | 940 m || 
|-id=944 bgcolor=#fefefe
| 423944 ||  || — || October 17, 2006 || Mount Lemmon || Mount Lemmon Survey || NYS || align=right data-sort-value="0.74" | 740 m || 
|-id=945 bgcolor=#fefefe
| 423945 ||  || — || September 30, 2006 || Mount Lemmon || Mount Lemmon Survey || NYS || align=right data-sort-value="0.60" | 600 m || 
|-id=946 bgcolor=#fefefe
| 423946 ||  || — || October 16, 2006 || Catalina || CSS || — || align=right data-sort-value="0.91" | 910 m || 
|-id=947 bgcolor=#fefefe
| 423947 ||  || — || October 2, 2006 || Mount Lemmon || Mount Lemmon Survey || — || align=right data-sort-value="0.71" | 710 m || 
|-id=948 bgcolor=#fefefe
| 423948 ||  || — || October 17, 2006 || Mount Lemmon || Mount Lemmon Survey || — || align=right data-sort-value="0.74" | 740 m || 
|-id=949 bgcolor=#fefefe
| 423949 ||  || — || September 25, 2006 || Kitt Peak || Spacewatch || — || align=right data-sort-value="0.73" | 730 m || 
|-id=950 bgcolor=#fefefe
| 423950 ||  || — || September 25, 2006 || Kitt Peak || Spacewatch || — || align=right data-sort-value="0.68" | 680 m || 
|-id=951 bgcolor=#fefefe
| 423951 ||  || — || October 2, 2006 || Mount Lemmon || Mount Lemmon Survey || H || align=right data-sort-value="0.62" | 620 m || 
|-id=952 bgcolor=#fefefe
| 423952 ||  || — || October 17, 2006 || Catalina || CSS || MAS || align=right data-sort-value="0.65" | 650 m || 
|-id=953 bgcolor=#fefefe
| 423953 ||  || — || October 19, 2006 || Kitt Peak || Spacewatch || CLA || align=right | 1.6 km || 
|-id=954 bgcolor=#E9E9E9
| 423954 ||  || — || October 19, 2006 || Kitt Peak || Spacewatch || — || align=right data-sort-value="0.86" | 860 m || 
|-id=955 bgcolor=#fefefe
| 423955 ||  || — || October 17, 2006 || Catalina || CSS || — || align=right data-sort-value="0.69" | 690 m || 
|-id=956 bgcolor=#fefefe
| 423956 ||  || — || October 17, 2006 || Goodricke-Pigott || R. A. Tucker || — || align=right data-sort-value="0.95" | 950 m || 
|-id=957 bgcolor=#fefefe
| 423957 ||  || — || October 17, 2006 || Mount Lemmon || Mount Lemmon Survey || MAS || align=right data-sort-value="0.78" | 780 m || 
|-id=958 bgcolor=#fefefe
| 423958 ||  || — || October 17, 2006 || Kitt Peak || Spacewatch || — || align=right data-sort-value="0.78" | 780 m || 
|-id=959 bgcolor=#fefefe
| 423959 ||  || — || October 18, 2006 || Kitt Peak || Spacewatch || NYS || align=right data-sort-value="0.59" | 590 m || 
|-id=960 bgcolor=#fefefe
| 423960 ||  || — || October 18, 2006 || Kitt Peak || Spacewatch || — || align=right | 1.2 km || 
|-id=961 bgcolor=#fefefe
| 423961 ||  || — || October 18, 2006 || Kitt Peak || Spacewatch || NYS || align=right data-sort-value="0.74" | 740 m || 
|-id=962 bgcolor=#fefefe
| 423962 ||  || — || October 19, 2006 || Kitt Peak || Spacewatch || — || align=right data-sort-value="0.73" | 730 m || 
|-id=963 bgcolor=#fefefe
| 423963 ||  || — || October 20, 2006 || Mount Lemmon || Mount Lemmon Survey || V || align=right data-sort-value="0.60" | 600 m || 
|-id=964 bgcolor=#fefefe
| 423964 ||  || — || October 16, 2006 || Catalina || CSS || — || align=right data-sort-value="0.81" | 810 m || 
|-id=965 bgcolor=#fefefe
| 423965 ||  || — || October 16, 2006 || Catalina || CSS || V || align=right data-sort-value="0.70" | 700 m || 
|-id=966 bgcolor=#FA8072
| 423966 ||  || — || October 19, 2006 || Catalina || CSS || H || align=right data-sort-value="0.76" | 760 m || 
|-id=967 bgcolor=#fefefe
| 423967 ||  || — || September 30, 2006 || Catalina || CSS || — || align=right data-sort-value="0.68" | 680 m || 
|-id=968 bgcolor=#fefefe
| 423968 ||  || — || October 19, 2006 || Catalina || CSS || — || align=right | 1.0 km || 
|-id=969 bgcolor=#fefefe
| 423969 ||  || — || September 25, 2006 || Kitt Peak || Spacewatch || — || align=right data-sort-value="0.58" | 580 m || 
|-id=970 bgcolor=#fefefe
| 423970 ||  || — || October 27, 2006 || Mount Lemmon || Mount Lemmon Survey || NYS || align=right data-sort-value="0.55" | 550 m || 
|-id=971 bgcolor=#fefefe
| 423971 ||  || — || October 27, 2006 || Mount Lemmon || Mount Lemmon Survey || MAS || align=right data-sort-value="0.67" | 670 m || 
|-id=972 bgcolor=#fefefe
| 423972 ||  || — || October 27, 2006 || Kitt Peak || Spacewatch || — || align=right data-sort-value="0.81" | 810 m || 
|-id=973 bgcolor=#d6d6d6
| 423973 ||  || — || September 30, 2006 || Mount Lemmon || Mount Lemmon Survey || — || align=right | 3.9 km || 
|-id=974 bgcolor=#d6d6d6
| 423974 ||  || — || October 16, 2006 || Apache Point || A. C. Becker || — || align=right | 3.2 km || 
|-id=975 bgcolor=#fefefe
| 423975 ||  || — || October 23, 2006 || Mount Lemmon || Mount Lemmon Survey || — || align=right data-sort-value="0.65" | 650 m || 
|-id=976 bgcolor=#fefefe
| 423976 ||  || — || October 20, 2006 || Kitt Peak || Spacewatch || MAS || align=right data-sort-value="0.57" | 570 m || 
|-id=977 bgcolor=#fefefe
| 423977 ||  || — || October 13, 2006 || Kitt Peak || Spacewatch || — || align=right data-sort-value="0.83" | 830 m || 
|-id=978 bgcolor=#fefefe
| 423978 ||  || — || November 10, 2006 || Kitt Peak || Spacewatch || NYS || align=right data-sort-value="0.66" | 660 m || 
|-id=979 bgcolor=#fefefe
| 423979 ||  || — || November 10, 2006 || Kitt Peak || Spacewatch || — || align=right data-sort-value="0.81" | 810 m || 
|-id=980 bgcolor=#fefefe
| 423980 ||  || — || October 17, 2006 || Mount Lemmon || Mount Lemmon Survey || — || align=right data-sort-value="0.98" | 980 m || 
|-id=981 bgcolor=#fefefe
| 423981 ||  || — || November 10, 2006 || Kitt Peak || Spacewatch || NYS || align=right data-sort-value="0.73" | 730 m || 
|-id=982 bgcolor=#fefefe
| 423982 ||  || — || November 14, 2006 || Mount Lemmon || Mount Lemmon Survey || — || align=right data-sort-value="0.74" | 740 m || 
|-id=983 bgcolor=#fefefe
| 423983 ||  || — || November 10, 2006 || Kitt Peak || Spacewatch || NYS || align=right data-sort-value="0.64" | 640 m || 
|-id=984 bgcolor=#fefefe
| 423984 ||  || — || November 11, 2006 || Kitt Peak || Spacewatch || — || align=right data-sort-value="0.81" | 810 m || 
|-id=985 bgcolor=#E9E9E9
| 423985 ||  || — || October 23, 2006 || Mount Lemmon || Mount Lemmon Survey || — || align=right data-sort-value="0.78" | 780 m || 
|-id=986 bgcolor=#fefefe
| 423986 ||  || — || November 11, 2006 || Kitt Peak || Spacewatch || — || align=right data-sort-value="0.66" | 660 m || 
|-id=987 bgcolor=#fefefe
| 423987 ||  || — || November 11, 2006 || Kitt Peak || Spacewatch || V || align=right data-sort-value="0.68" | 680 m || 
|-id=988 bgcolor=#fefefe
| 423988 ||  || — || September 28, 2006 || Mount Lemmon || Mount Lemmon Survey || — || align=right data-sort-value="0.77" | 770 m || 
|-id=989 bgcolor=#fefefe
| 423989 ||  || — || November 11, 2006 || Kitt Peak || Spacewatch || — || align=right data-sort-value="0.83" | 830 m || 
|-id=990 bgcolor=#fefefe
| 423990 ||  || — || October 22, 2006 || Catalina || CSS || — || align=right data-sort-value="0.97" | 970 m || 
|-id=991 bgcolor=#fefefe
| 423991 ||  || — || November 12, 2006 || Mount Lemmon || Mount Lemmon Survey || — || align=right data-sort-value="0.74" | 740 m || 
|-id=992 bgcolor=#E9E9E9
| 423992 ||  || — || October 22, 2006 || Mount Lemmon || Mount Lemmon Survey || — || align=right data-sort-value="0.98" | 980 m || 
|-id=993 bgcolor=#fefefe
| 423993 ||  || — || November 12, 2006 || Mount Lemmon || Mount Lemmon Survey || NYS || align=right data-sort-value="0.65" | 650 m || 
|-id=994 bgcolor=#fefefe
| 423994 ||  || — || November 13, 2006 || Kitt Peak || Spacewatch || — || align=right data-sort-value="0.76" | 760 m || 
|-id=995 bgcolor=#fefefe
| 423995 ||  || — || October 19, 2006 || Catalina || CSS || H || align=right data-sort-value="0.83" | 830 m || 
|-id=996 bgcolor=#fefefe
| 423996 ||  || — || November 14, 2006 || Kitt Peak || Spacewatch || — || align=right data-sort-value="0.61" | 610 m || 
|-id=997 bgcolor=#fefefe
| 423997 ||  || — || November 14, 2006 || Kitt Peak || Spacewatch || — || align=right data-sort-value="0.76" | 760 m || 
|-id=998 bgcolor=#fefefe
| 423998 ||  || — || November 14, 2006 || Mount Lemmon || Mount Lemmon Survey || — || align=right data-sort-value="0.74" | 740 m || 
|-id=999 bgcolor=#fefefe
| 423999 ||  || — || November 14, 2006 || Kitt Peak || Spacewatch || — || align=right data-sort-value="0.90" | 900 m || 
|-id=000 bgcolor=#fefefe
| 424000 ||  || — || October 20, 2006 || Mount Lemmon || Mount Lemmon Survey || — || align=right | 1.0 km || 
|}

References

External links 
 Discovery Circumstances: Numbered Minor Planets (420001)–(425000) (IAU Minor Planet Center)

0423